= Fencing at the Summer Youth Olympics =

- Governing body: FIE
- Events: 7 (men: 3; women: 3; mixed: 1)

Games
- 2010; 2014; 2018; 2026

Fencing was inducted at the Youth Olympic Games at the inaugural edition in 2010.

== Medal summaries ==
=== Boys ===
==== Épée ====
| Games | Gold | Silver | Bronze |
|---|---|---|---|
| 2010 Singapore | Marco Fichera; Italy | Nikolaus Bodoczi; Germany | Alexandre Lyssov; Canada |
| 2014 Nanjing | Patrik Esztergályos; Hungary | Linus Islas Flygare; Sweden | Ivan Limarev; Russia |
| 2018 Buenos Aires | Davide Di Veroli; Italy | Paul Veltrup; Germany | Khasan Baudunov; Kyrgyzstan |
| 2026 Dakar | Simon Shan; Canada | Vukan Rađenović; Serbia | Wout Van Laecke; Belgium |

==== Foil ====
| Games | Gold | Silver | Bronze |
|---|---|---|---|
| 2010 Singapore | Edoardo Luperi; Italy | Alexander Massialas; United States | Lee Kwang-hyun; South Korea |
| 2014 Nanjing | Andrzej Rządkowski; Poland | Ryan Choi; Hong Kong | Enguerand Roger; France |
| 2018 Buenos Aires | Armand Spichiger; France | Kenji Bravo; United States | Jonas Winterberg-Poulsen; Denmark |
| 2026 Dakar | Harris Ho; Hong Kong | Masashi Maeda; Japan | Aris Kiayias; Cyprus |

==== Sabre ====
| Games | Gold | Silver | Bronze |
|---|---|---|---|
| 2010 Singapore | Song Jong-hun; South Korea | Leonardo Affede; Italy | Richard Hubers; Germany |
| 2014 Nanjing | Ivan Ilin; Russia | Kim Dong-ju; South Korea | Yan Yinghui; China |
| 2018 Buenos Aires | Krisztian Rabb; Hungary | Hyun Jun; South Korea | Mazen Elaraby; Egypt |
| 2026 Dakar | Candeniz Berrak; Turkey | Aibar Kaiym; Kazakhstan | Ashton Auw; Singapore |

=== Girls ===
==== Épée ====
| Games | Gold | Silver | Bronze |
|---|---|---|---|
| 2010 Singapore | Lin Sheng; China | Alberta Santuccio; Italy | Martyna Swatowska; Poland |
| 2014 Nanjing | Lee Sin-hee; South Korea | Eleonora De Marchi; Italy | Åsa Linde; Sweden |
| 2018 Buenos Aires | Kateryna Chorniy; Ukraine | Kaylin Hsieh; Hong Kong | Veronika Bieleszová; Czech Republic |
| 2026 Dakar | Lotti Horváth; Hungary | Alina Dmytruk; Ukraine | Francesca Aina; Italy |

==== Foil ====
| Games | Gold | Silver | Bronze |
|---|---|---|---|
| 2010 Singapore | Camilla Mancini; Italy | Victoria Alexeeva; Russia | Dóra Lupkovics; Hungary |
| 2014 Nanjing | Sabrina Massialas; United States | Karin Miyawaki; Japan | Huang Ali; China |
| 2018 Buenos Aires | Yuka Ueno; Japan | Martina Favaretto; Italy | May Tieu; United States |
| 2026 Dakar | Uliana Belykh; Russia | Sara Amr Hossny; Egypt | Lena Mayerl; Austria |

==== Sabre ====
| Games | Gold | Silver | Bronze |
|---|---|---|---|
| 2010 Singapore | Yana Egorian; Russia | Celina Merza; United States | Anja Musch; Germany |
| 2014 Nanjing | Alina Moseyko; Russia | Chiara Crovari; Italy | Petra Záhonyi; Hungary |
| 2018 Buenos Aires | Liza Pusztai; Hungary | Natalia Botello; Mexico | Lee Ju-eun; South Korea |
| 2026 Dakar | Pan Qimiao; China | Jeon Yu-ju; South Korea | Nargiza Utebaeva; Uzbekistan |

=== Mixed ===
==== Mixed team event ====
| Games | Gold | Silver | Bronze |
|---|---|---|---|
| 2010 Singapore | Europe 1 Yana Egorian (RUS); Marco Fichera (ITA); Camilla Mancini (ITA); Leonardo Affede (ITA); Alberta Santuccio (ITA); Edoardo Luperi (ITA) | Europe 2 Anja Musch (GER); Nikolaus Bodoczi (GER); Victoria Alexeeva (RUS); Richard Hubers (GER); Martyna Swatowska (POL); Tevfik Babaoğlu (TUR) | Americas 1 Celina Merza (USA); Alexandre Lyssov (CAN); Alanna Goldie (CAN); Will Spear (USA); Katharine Holmes (USA); Alexander Massialas (USA) |
| 2014 Nanjing | Asia-Oceania 1 Albert Chien (HKG); Ryan Choi (HKG); Misaki Emura (JPN); Kim Dong-ju (KOR); Lee Sin-hee (KOR); Karin Miyawaki (JPN) | Europe 1 Patrik Ezstergályos (HUN); Marta Martyanova (RUS); Ivan Ilin (RUS); Eleonora De Marchi (ITA); Andrzej Rządkowski (POL); Alina Moseyko (RUS) | Europe 2 Chiara Crovari (ITA); Marios Giakoumatos (GRE); Linus Islas Flygare (SWE); Åsa Linde (SWE); Enguerand Roger (FRA); Anna Szymczak (POL) |
| 2018 Buenos Aires | Europe 1 Kateryna Chorniy (UKR); Martina Favaretto (ITA); Liza Pusztai (HUN); Davide Di Veroli (ITA); Armand Spichiger (FRA); Krisztian Rabb (HUN) | Asia-Oceania 1 Kaylin Hsieh (HKG); Yuka Ueno (JPN); Lee Ju-eun (KOR); Khasan Baudunov (KGZ); Chen Yi-tung (TPE); Hyun Jun (KOR) | Americas 1 Emily Vermeule (USA); May Tieu (USA); Natalia Botello (MEX); Isaac Herbst (USA); Kenji Bravo (USA); Robert Vidovszky (USA) |

== Medal table ==
As of the 2026 Summer Youth Olympics.

| Rank | Nation | Gold | Silver | Bronze | Total |
|---|---|---|---|---|---|
| 1 | Italy | 4 | 5 | 1 | 10 |
| 2 | Russia | 4 | 1 | 1 | 6 |
| 3 | Hungary | 4 | 0 | 2 | 6 |
| – | Mixed-NOCs | 3 | 3 | 3 | 9 |
| 4 | South Korea | 2 | 3 | 2 | 7 |
| 5 | China | 2 | 0 | 2 | 4 |
| 6 | United States | 1 | 3 | 1 | 5 |
| 7 | Hong Kong | 1 | 2 | 0 | 3 |
| 7 | Japan | 1 | 2 | 0 | 3 |
| 9 | Ukraine | 1 | 1 | 0 | 2 |
| 10 | Canada | 1 | 0 | 1 | 2 |
| 10 | France | 1 | 0 | 1 | 2 |
| 10 | Poland | 1 | 0 | 1 | 2 |
| 13 | Turkey | 1 | 0 | 0 | 1 |
| 14 | Germany | 0 | 2 | 2 | 4 |
| 15 | Egypt | 0 | 1 | 1 | 2 |
| 15 | Sweden | 0 | 1 | 1 | 2 |
| 17 | Kazakhstan | 0 | 1 | 0 | 1 |
| 17 | Mexico | 0 | 1 | 0 | 1 |
| 17 | Serbia | 0 | 1 | 0 | 1 |
| 20 | Austria | 0 | 0 | 1 | 1 |
| 20 | Belgium | 0 | 0 | 1 | 1 |
| 20 | Cyprus | 0 | 0 | 1 | 1 |
| 20 | Czech Republic | 0 | 0 | 1 | 1 |
| 20 | Denmark | 0 | 0 | 1 | 1 |
| 20 | Kyrgyzstan | 0 | 0 | 1 | 1 |
| 20 | Singapore | 0 | 0 | 1 | 1 |
| 20 | Uzbekistan | 0 | 0 | 1 | 1 |
| Totals (27 entries) | | 27 | 27 | 27 | 81 |

== See also ==
- Fencing at the Summer Olympics
