= Fencing at the 2010 Summer Youth Olympics =

Fencing at the I Summer Youth Olympic Games
- Venue: Suntec Singapore Convention and Exhibition Centre
- Dates: 15 – 18 August 2010
- No. of events: 7 (3 boys, 3 girls, 1 mixed)
- Competitors: 78 from 36 nations

Fencing competitions at the 2010 Summer Youth Olympics in Singapore consisted of three Cadet Male individual events, three Cadet Female individual events and one team event including both genders and all 3 weapons: épée, foil and saber. 78 fencers from 36 nations were competing. The venue was located at the International Convention Centre (ICC).

Fencing was one of the five sports that was continually featured at the Olympics since Athens in 1896; the others being athletics, swimming, cycling and gymnastics.

== Schedule ==
Event date	Event day	Approx. duration	Starting time	Event details
15 August	Sunday	11:00 hrs	9:30 am	Men's Sabre
15 August	Sunday	11:00 hrs	12:00 pm	Women's Foil
16 August	Monday	11:00 hrs	12:00 pm	Men's Épée
16 August	Monday	11:00 hrs	9:30 am	Women's Sabre
17 August	Tuesday	13:15 hrs	9:00 am	Men's Foil
17 August	Tuesday	13:15 hrs	1:00 pm	Women's Épée
18 August	Wednesday	6:45 hrs	9:00 am	Mixed Team Fencing

== Qualifications ==
=== FIE Qualifications After 2010 Baku Cadet World Championships ===
Initially FIE qualified 54 fencers based on the results of 2010 Cadet World Championships in Baku with 1 more entry in each weapon reserved for a host country.

A table below illustrates these selections, where number in brackets near fencers' names shows their placement in 2010 Cadet World Championships:

Women's épée	NOC	Men's épée	NOC	Women's foil	NOC	Men's foil	NOC	Women's sabre	NOC	Men's sabre	NOC
Alberta Santuccio (1)	Italy	Nikolaus Bodoczi (1)	Germany	Camilla Mancini (2)	Italy	Alexander Massialas (1)	United States	Alina Komashchuk (1)	Ukraine	Richard Hübers (1)	Germany
Lee Hye-won (2)	South Korea	Roman Svichkar (3)	Ukraine	Dora Lupkovics (3)	Hungary	Edoardo Luperi (2)	Italy	Seo Ji-yeon (3)	South Korea	Leonardo Affede (3)	Italy
Amalia Tătăran (3)	Romania	Tomasz Kruk (5)	Poland	Wang Lianlian (3)	China	Kirill Lichagin (3)	Russia	Yana Egorian (5)	Russia	Artur Okunev (3)	Russia
Lin Sheng (3)	China	Lucian Ciovică (6)	Romania	Victoria Alexeeva (5)	Russia	Alexander Choupenitch (5)	Czech Republic	Angelika Wątor (6)	Poland	Mikhail Akula (5)	Belarus
Katharine Holmes (5)	United States	Kirill Zhakupov (14)	Kazakhstan	Mona Shaito (7)	United States	Alexander Tsoronis (7)	Denmark	Anja Musch (7)	Germany	Will Spear (9)	United States
Yulia Bakhareva (6)	Russia	Na Byeong-hun (15)	South Korea	Michala Cellerová (9)	Slovakia	Lee Kwang Hyun (9)	South Korea	Wan Yini (17)	China	Jackson Wang (11)	Hong Kong
Amy Radford (8)	Great Britain	Alexandre Lyssov (16)	Canada	Choi Duk-ha (17)	South Korea	Nicholas Edward Choi (10)	Hong Kong	Celina Merza (18)	United States	Song Jong-hun (23)	South Korea
Isabel Di Tella (37)	Argentina	Guilherme Melaragno (36)	Brazil	Alanna Goldie (18)	Canada	Mostafa Mahmoud (27)	Egypt	Mennatalla Ahmed (23)	Egypt	Miguel Breault-Mallette (35)	Canada
Wanda Matshaya (60)	South Africa	Saleh Saleh (63)	Egypt	Menattalla Daw (38)	Egypt	Redys Hanngrs Prades Rosabal (33)	Cuba	María Carreño (32)	Venezuela	Ziad Elsissy (67)	Egypt
	Singapore		Singapore		Singapore		Singapore		Singapore		Singapore

=== Final selections ===
Finalized selection table included 20 additional fencers added by FIE and IOC based on the final revision of "Criteria for qualification to the 2010 YOG" published here. The following table illustrates final selections where numbers in brackets near fencers' names indicates their placement in 2010 Cadet WC (zero indicates that fencer did not participate).

Women's épée	NOC	Men's épée	NOC	Women's foil	NOC	Men's foil	NOC	Women's sabre	NOC	Men's sabre	NOC
Alberta Santuccio (1)	Italy	Nikolaus Bodoczi (1)	Germany	Camilla Mancini(2)	Italy	Alexander Massialas(1)	United States	Alina Komashchuk(1)	Ukraine	Richard Hübers(1)	Germany
Lee Hye-won (2)	South Korea	Roman Svichkar(3)	Ukraine	Dora Lupkovics (3)	Hungary	Edoardo Luperi(2)	Italy	Seo Ji-yeon(3)	South Korea	Leonardo Affede(3)	Italy
Amalia Tătăran (3)	Romania	Tomasz Kruk (5)	Poland	Wang Lianlian (3)	China	Kirill Lichagin (3)	Russia	Yana Egorian (5)	Russia	Artur Okunev(3)	Russia
Lin Sheng (3)	China	Lucian Ciovică(6)	Romania	Victoria Alexeeva(5)	Russia	Alexander Choupenitch(5)	Czech Republic	Angelika Wątor(6)	Poland	Mikhail Akula(5)	Belarus
Katharine Holmes (5)	United States	Kirill Zhakupov (14)	Kazakhstan	Mona Shaito(7)	United States	Alexander Tsoronis(7)	Denmark	Anja Musch(7)	Germany	Will Spear(9)	United States
Yulia Bakhareva (6)	Russia	Na Byeong-hun (15)	South Korea	Michala Cellerová (9)	Slovakia	Lee Kwang-hyun(9)	South Korea	Wan Yini (17)	China	Jackson Wang (11)	Hong Kong
Amy Radford (8)	Great Britain	Alexandre Lyssov (16)	Canada	Choi Duk-ha(17)	South Korea	Nicholas Edward Choi(10)	Hong Kong	Celina Merza(18)	United States	Song Jong-hun (23)	South Korea
Isabel Di Tella (37)	Argentina	Guilherme Melaragno(36)	Brazil	Alanna Goldie(18)	Canada	Mostafa Mahmoud(27)	Egypt	Mennatalla Ahmed(23)	Egypt	Miguel Breault-Mallette (35)	Canada
Matshaya Wanda (60)	South Africa	Saleh Saleh(63)	Egypt	Menattalla Daw(38)	Egypt	Redys Hanngrs Prades Rosabal (33)	Cuba	María Carreño(32)	Venezuela	Ziad Elsissy(67)	Egypt
Martyna Swatowska (9)	Poland	Ondřej Novotný (8)	Czech Republic	Ivania Carballo(58)	El Salvador	Antal Györgyi (8)	Hungary	Nyabileke Gracia Makwanya (0)	Democratic Republic of the Congo	Dragoș Sîrbu (6)	Romania
Pauline Brunner (12)	Switzerland	Julian Godoy (88)	Costa Rica	Rita Abou Jaoudé (0)	Lebanon	Tevfik Burak Babaoğlu (11)	Turkey	Ema Hilwiyah (0)	Iraq	András Szatmári (7)	Hungary
Damyan Jaqman (0)	Palestine	Marco Fichera (9)	Italy	Mame Awa Ndao (70)	Senegal	Alex Tofalides (13)	Great Britain	Vittoria Ciardullo (13)	Italy	Djibrilla Issaka Kondo (0)	Niger
Rania Herlina Rahardja (62)	Singapore	Lim Wei Hao (0)	Singapore	Liane Wong Ye Ying (48)	Singapore	Justin Xian Shi Ong (49)	Singapore	Kenza Boudad (11)	France	Arthur Zatko(10)	France

== Mixed teams composition ==
In total there will be 9 continental teams formed. The composition of the teams will be determined by the results achieved during the individual events. The best fencers ranked in each weapon will form the top team of each continent as follows: Europe 1, Europe 2, Europe 3, Europe 4, Asia 1, Asia 2, Americas 1, Americas 2, Africa.

== Medal summary ==
=== Medal table ===
This table presents only individual results. Mixed team medals are not included.

Rank	Nation	Gold	Silver	Bronze	Total
1	Italy	3	2	0	5
2	Russia	1	1	0	2
3	South Korea	1	0	1	2
4	China	1	0	0	1
5	United States	0	2	0	2
6	Germany	0	1	2	3
7	Canada	0	0	1	1
7	Hungary	0	0	1	1
7	Poland	0	0	1	1
Totals (9 entries)		6	6	6	18

=== Events ===
Event	Gold	Silver	Bronze
Cadet Male Épée	Marco Fichera; Italy	Nikolaus Bodoczi; Germany	Alexandre Lyssov; Canada
Cadet Male Foil	Edoardo Luperi; Italy	Alexander Massialas; United States	Lee Kwang-hyun; South Korea
Cadet Male Sabre	Song Jong-hun; South Korea	Leonardo Affede; Italy	Richard Hübers; Germany
Cadet Female Épée	Lin Sheng; China	Alberta Santuccio; Italy	Martyna Swatowska; Poland
Cadet Female Foil	Camilla Mancini; Italy	Victoria Alexeeva; Russia	Dóra Lupkovics; Hungary
Cadet Female Sabre	Yana Egorian; Russia	Celina Merza; United States	Anja Musch; Germany
Mixed Team Event	Europe 1 (MIX); Yana Egorian (RUS); Marco Fichera (ITA); Camilla Mancini (ITA); Leonardo Affede (ITA); Alberta Santuccio (ITA); Edoardo Luperi (ITA)	Europe 2 (MIX); Anja Musch (GER); Nikolaus Bodoczi (GER); Victoria Alexeeva (RUS); Richard Hübers (GER); Martyna Swatowska (POL); Tevfik Burak Babaoğlu (TUR)	Americas 1 (MIX); Celina Merza (USA); Alexandre Lyssov (CAN); Alanna Goldie (CAN); Will Spear (USA); Katharine Holmes (USA); Alexander Massialas (USA)

== Participating nations ==
- Argentina (1)
- Belarus (1)
- Brazil (1)
- Canada (3)
- China (3)
- Democratic Republic of the Congo (1)
- Costa Rica (1)
- Cuba (1)
- Czech Republic (2)
- Denmark (1)
- Egypt (5)
- El Salvador (1)
- France (2)
- Germany (3)
- Great Britain (2)
- Hong Kong (2)
- Hungary (3)
- Iraq (1)
- Italy (6)
- Kazakhstan (1)
- South Korea (6)
- Lebanon (1)
- Niger (1)
- Palestine (1)
- Poland (3)
- Romania (3)
- Russia (5)
- Senegal (1)
- Singapore (4)
- Slovakia (1)
- South Africa (1)
- Switzerland (1)
- Turkey (1)
- Ukraine (2)
- United States (5)
- Venezuela (1)

== Fencer's distribution by continent ==
	Women's épée	Men's épée	Women's foil	Men's foil	Women's saber	Men's Saber	Totals	Maximum # of teams	# of fencers qualified for a team	# of fencers not qualified for a team
Europe	6	6	4	6	6	8	36	4	24	12
Americas	2	3	3	2	2	2	14	2	12	2
Asia	4	3	4	4	3	2	20	2	12	8
Africa	1	1	2	1	2	1	8	1	6	2
Totals	13	13	13	13	13	13	78	9	54	24

== See also ==
- Fédération Internationale d'Escrime (FIE)
