= Italy at the 2010 Summer Youth Olympics =

- IOC code: ITA
- NOC: Italian National Olympic Committee
- Website: www.coni.it

in Singapore
- Competitors: 62 in 19 sports
- Flag bearer: Alberta Santuccio
- Medals Ranked 10th: Gold 5 Silver 9 Bronze 5 Total 19

Summer Youth Olympics appearances
- 2010; 2014; 2018; 2026

Italy competed at the 2010 Summer Youth Olympics, the inaugural Youth Olympic Games, held in Singapore from 14 August to 26 August 2010.

== Medalists ==
| Medal | Name | Sport | Event | Date |
|---|---|---|---|---|
| Gold | Camilla Mancini | Fencing | Cadet female foil | 15 Aug |
| Gold | Marco Fichera | Fencing | Cadet male épée | 16 Aug |
| Gold | Edoardo Luperi | Fencing | Cadet male foil | 17 Aug |
| Gold | Alberta Santuccio; Marco Fichera; Camilla Mancini; Leonardo Affede; Edoardo Luperi | Fencing | Mixed team | 18 Aug |
| Gold | Flavio Bizzarri | Swimming | Youth Men's 200m Breaststroke | 18 Aug |
| Gold | Gloria Filippi | Archery | Mixed team | 19 Aug |
| Gold | Valentina Isoardi | Equestrian | Team jumping | 20 Aug |
| Gold | Anna Clemente | Athletics | Girls' 5000m Walk | 21 Aug |
| Silver | Leonardo Affede | Fencing | Cadet male sabre | 15 Aug |
| Silver | Martina Carraro | Swimming | Youth Women's 50m Breaststroke | 16 Aug |
| Silver | Alberta Santuccio | Fencing | Cadet female épée | 17 Aug |
| Silver | Elena di Liddo | Swimming | Youth Women's 50m Butterfly | 18 Aug |
| Silver | Carlotta Ferlito | Gymnastics | Women's beam | 22 Aug |
| Silver | Alessia Trost | Athletics | Girls' high jump | 22 Aug |
| Silver | Andrea Righettini; Alessia Bulleri; Nicholas Marini; Mattia Furlan | Cycling | Combined mixed team | 22 Aug |
| Silver | Marco Lorenzi | Athletics | Boys' medley relay | 23 Aug |
| Silver | Fabio Turchi | Boxing | Men's Heavy 91kg | 25 Aug |
| Silver | Veronica Fanciulli | Sailing | Windsurfing (Techno 293) | 25 Aug |
| Bronze | Flavio Bizzarri | Swimming | Youth Men's 100m Breaststroke | 16 Aug |
| Bronze | Tommaso Romani | Swimming | Youth Men's 50m Butterfly | 19 Aug |
| Bronze | Carlotta Ferlito | Gymnastics | Women's Individual All-Around final | 19 Aug |
| Bronze | Carlotta Ferlito | Gymnastics | Women's vault | 21 Aug |
| Bronze | Ludovico Edalli | Gymnastics | Men's parallel bars | 22 Aug |
| Bronze | Anna Bongiorni | Athletics | Girls' medley relay | 23 Aug |
| Bronze | Fabio Basile | Judo | Mixed team | 25 Aug |

== Archery ==
Boys

| Athlete | Event | Ranking Round | | Round of 32 | Round of 16 | Quarterfinals | Semifinals | Final | |
| Athlete | Event | Score | Seed | Opposition Score | Opposition Score | Opposition Score | Opposition Score | Opposition Score | Rank |
|---|---|---|---|---|---|---|---|---|---|
| Lorenzo Pianesi | Boys’ Individual | 598 | 22 | Yilmaz (TUR); L 5-6 | Did not advance | | | | 17 |

Girls

| Athlete | Event | Ranking Round | | Round of 32 | Round of 16 | Quarterfinals | Semifinals | Final | |
| Athlete | Event | Score | Seed | Opposition Score | Opposition Score | Opposition Score | Opposition Score | Opposition Score | Rank |
|---|---|---|---|---|---|---|---|---|---|
| Gloria Filippi | Girls’ Individual | 623 | 9 | Ingley (AUS); L 4-6 | Did not advance | | | | 17 |

Mixed Team

| Athlete | Event | Partner | Round of 32 | Round of 16 | Quarterfinals | Semifinals | Final | |
| Athlete | Event | Partner | Opposition Score | Opposition Score | Opposition Score | Opposition Score | Opposition Score | Rank |
|---|---|---|---|---|---|---|---|---|
| Lorenza Pianesi | Mixed Team | Song Jia (CHN) | Cheok (SIN)/ Farjat (MEX); W 6-0 | Okubo (JPN)/ Ku (TPE); W 6-0 | Paraskevopoulou (GRE)/ Rajh (SLO); L 4-6 | Did not advance | | 6 |
| Gloria Filippi | Mixed Team | Anton Karoukin (BLR) | Kwak (KOR)/ Gyi (MYA); W 6-0 | Mirca (MDA)/ Ipsen (DEN); W 6-4 | Hul (BLR)/ Luo (CHN); W 6-0 | Unsal (TUR)/ Jaffar (SIN); W 6-0 | Paraskevopoulou (GRE)/ Rajh (SLO); W 7-3 | Gold medal |

== Athletics ==
=== Boys ===
Track and Road Events

| Athletes | Event | Qualification | | Final | |
| Athletes | Event | Result | Rank | Result | Rank |
|---|---|---|---|---|---|
| Luca Valbonesi | Boys’ 200m | 22.14 | 12 qB | 21.98 | 9 |
| Marco Lorenzi | Boys’ 400m | 48.40 | 9 qB | 48.31 | 9 |
| Leonardo Serra | Boys’ 10km Walk | | | 45:19.73 | 4 |
| David Bolarinwa (GBR); Tomasz Kluczynski (POL); Marco Lorenzi (ITA); Nikita Uglov (RUS) | Boys’ Medley Relay | | | 1:52.11 | Silver medal |

Field Events

| Athletes | Event | Qualification | | Final | |
| Athletes | Event | Result | Rank | Result | Rank |
|---|---|---|---|---|---|
| Riccardo Pagan | Boys’ Long Jump | 7.00 | 12 qB | DNS | |
| Eugenio Meloni | Boys’ High Jump | 2.00 | 13 qB | 1.85 | 15 |

=== Girls ===
Track and Road Events

| Athletes | Event | Qualification | | Final | |
| Athletes | Event | Result | Rank | Result | Rank |
|---|---|---|---|---|---|
| Anna Bongiorni | Girls’ 200m | 24.65 | 7 Q | 24.53 | 7 |
| Valentine Marchese | Girls’ 3000m | 10:06.08 | 10 Q | 10:11.18 | 9 |
| Anna Clemente | Girls’ 5km Walk | | | 22:27.38 | Gold medal |
| Annie Tagoe (GBR); Anna Bongiorni (ITA); Sonja Mosler (GER); Bianca Răzor (ROU) | Girls’ Medley Relay | | | 2:07.59 | Bronze medal |

Field Events

| Athletes | Event | Qualification | | Final | |
| Athletes | Event | Result | Rank | Result | Rank |
|---|---|---|---|---|---|
| Roberta Molardi | Girls’ Javelin Throw | 43.44 | 9 qB | 43.90 | 13 |
| Francesca Massobrio | Girls’ Hammer Throw | 50.73 | 10 qB | 48.43 | 14 |
| Anna Visibelli | Girls’ Long Jump | 5.81 | 10 qB | 6.00 | 9 |
| Alessia Trost | Girls’ High Jump | 1.76 | 1 Q | 1.86 | Silver medal |

== Basketball ==
Girls

| Squad List | Event | Group Stage | | Placement Stage | | | Rank |
| Squad List | Event | Group D | Rank | 9th-16th | 9th-12th | 9th-10th | Rank |
|---|---|---|---|---|---|---|---|
| Francesca Dotto; Caterina Dotto; Chiara Terenzi; Marta Maria Masoni (C) | Girls' Basketball | France; W 26-11 | 3 | Mali; W 29-18 | Belarus; W 29-28 | France; W 26-18 | 9 |
| Francesca Dotto; Caterina Dotto; Chiara Terenzi; Marta Maria Masoni (C) | Girls' Basketball | Japan; W 26-17 | 3 | Mali; W 29-18 | Belarus; W 29-28 | France; W 26-18 | 9 |
| Francesca Dotto; Caterina Dotto; Chiara Terenzi; Marta Maria Masoni (C) | Girls' Basketball | Australia; L 15-29 | 3 | Mali; W 29-18 | Belarus; W 29-28 | France; W 26-18 | 9 |
| Francesca Dotto; Caterina Dotto; Chiara Terenzi; Marta Maria Masoni (C) | Girls' Basketball | Chile; W 21-8 | 3 | Mali; W 29-18 | Belarus; W 29-28 | France; W 26-18 | 9 |

== Boxing ==
Boys

| Athlete | Event | Preliminaries | Semifinals | Final | Rank |
|---|---|---|---|---|---|
| Fabio Turchi | Heavyweight (91kg) | | Siyovush Zukhurov (TJK); W 7-0 | Lenier Eunice Pero (CUB); L RSCH R1 1:27 | Silver medal |

== Cycling ==
Cross Country

| Athlete | Event | Time | Rank | Points |
|---|---|---|---|---|
| Andrea Righettini | Boys’ Cross Country | 59:29 | 2 | 10 |
| Alessia Bulleri | Girls’ Cross Country | 50:23 | 4 | 12 |

Time Trial

| Athlete | Event | Time | Rank | Points |
|---|---|---|---|---|
| Nicolas Marini | Boys’ Time Trial | 4:08.62 | 7 | 16 |
| Alessia Bulleri | Girls’ Time Trial | 3:33.42 | 7 | 21 |

BMX

| Athlete | Event | Seeding Round | | Quarterfinals | | | | | | | Semifinals | | | | | | | Final | | |
| Athlete | Event | Seeding Round | | Run 1 | | Run 2 | | Run 3 | | Rank | Run 1 | | Run 2 | | Run 3 | | Rank | Final | | |
| Athlete | Event | Time | Rank | Time | Rank | Time | Rank | Time | Rank | Rank | Time | Rank | Time | Rank | Time | Rank | Rank | Time | Rank | Points |
|---|---|---|---|---|---|---|---|---|---|---|---|---|---|---|---|---|---|---|---|---|
| Mattia Furlan | Boys’ BMX | 33.045 | 12 | 32.995 | 3 | 33.485 | 3 | 33.671 | 3 | 3 Q | 33.693 | 6 | 1:07.489 | 7 | 33.408 | 5 | 6 | Did not advance | | 61 |
| Alessia Bulleri | Girls’ BMX | 45.185 | 15 | 44.350 | 4 | 44.802 | 4 | 44.705 | 4 | 4 Q | 45.993 | 8 | 45.501 | 8 | 46.191 | 8 | 8 | Did not advance | | 39 |

Road Race

| Athlete | Event | Time | Rank | Points |
|---|---|---|---|---|
| Nicolas Marini | Boys’ Road Race | 1:05:44 | 3 | 12* |
| Andrea Righettini | Boys’ Road Race | 1:05:44 | 33 | |
| Mattia Furlan | Boys’ Road Race | 1:34:06 | 79 | |

Overall

| Team | Event | Cross Country Pts | | Time Trial Pts | | BMX Pts | | Road Race Pts | Total | Rank |
| Team | Event | Boys | Girls | Boys | Girls | Boys | Girls | Road Race Pts | Total | Rank |
|---|---|---|---|---|---|---|---|---|---|---|
| Alessia Bulleri; Andrea Righettini; Nicolas Marini; Mattia Furlan | Mixed Team | 10 | 12 | 16 | 21 | 61 | 39 | 12* | 171 | Silver medal |

- * Received -5 for finishing road race with all three racers

== Diving ==
Boys

| Athlete | Event | Preliminary | | Final | |
| Athlete | Event | Points | Rank | Points | Rank |
|---|---|---|---|---|---|
| Giovanni Tocci | Boys’ 3m Springboard | 521.90 | 5 Q | 547.50 | 4 |

Girls

| Athlete | Event | Preliminary | | Final | |
| Athlete | Event | Points | Rank | Points | Rank |
|---|---|---|---|---|---|
| Elena Bertocchi | Girls’ 3m Springboard | 404.85 | 4 Q | 411.50 | 6 |

== Equestrian ==
| Athlete | Horse | Event | Round 1 | | | Round 2 | | | Total | Jump-Off | | Rank |
| Athlete | Horse | Event | Penalties | | Rank | Penalties | | Rank | Total | Penalties | Time | Rank |
| Athlete | Horse | Event | Jump | Time | Rank | Jump | Time | Rank | Total | Penalties | Time | Rank |
|---|---|---|---|---|---|---|---|---|---|---|---|---|
| Martin Fuchs (SUI); Wojciech Dahlke (POL); Valentina Isoardi (ITA); Carian Scudamore (GBR); Nicola Philippaerts (BEL) | Midnight Mist; Travelling Soldior; Alloria Thomas; Mighty Mcgyver; Gippsland Girl | Team Jumping | 0; ~~12~~; ~~28~~; 0; 4 | 0; ~~0~~; ~~0~~; 0; 0 | 1 | 0; 4; ~~16~~; 0; ~~4~~ | 0; 0; ~~0~~; 0; ~~0~~ | 2 | 8 | 0; 0; ~~24~~; 4; ~~DNS~~ | 45.30; 49.19; ~~54.92~~; 46.54; ~~DNS~~ | Gold medal |

== Fencing ==
Group Stage

| Athlete | Event | Match 1 | Match 2 | Match 3 | Match 4 | Match 5 | Match 6 | Seed |
|---|---|---|---|---|---|---|---|---|
| Marco Fichera | Boys’ Épée | Svichkar (UKR); L 4-5 | Zhakupov (KAZ); W 5-4 | Kruk (POL); W 5-3 | Melaragno (BRA); W 5-2 | Saleh (EGY); W 5-0 | | 1 |
| Edoardo Luperi | Boys’ Foil | Lichagin (RUS); W 5-2 | Gyorgyi (HUN); W 5-0 | Tofalides (GBR); W 5-3 | Lee (KOR); W 5-0 | Mahmoud (EGY); W 5-2 | | 2 |
| Leonardo Affede | Boys’ Sabre | Szatmári (HUN); L 3-5 | Spear (USA); W 5-1 | Okunev (RUS); W 5-3 | Mallette (CAN); W 5-2 | Song (KOR); W 5-4 | | 3 |
| Alberta Santuccio | Girls’ Épée | Rahardja (SIN); W 5-1 | Jaqman (PLE); W 5-3 | Holmes (USA); L 2-3 | Lin (CHN); L 2-5 | Swatowska (POL); L 4-5 | Brunner (SUI); W 5-1 | 7 |
| Camilla Mancini | Girls’ Foil | Jaoude (LIB); W 5-2 | Goldie (CAN); L 2-5 | Alekseeva (RUS); L 0-5 | Shaito (USA); W 5-4 | Daw (EGY); W 5-0 | Ndao (SEN); W 5-1 | 5 |
| Victoria Ciardullo | Girls’ Sabre | Seo (KOR); L 3-5 | Boudad (FRA); L 1-5 | Ahmed (EGY); L 0-5 | Egoryan (RUS); W 5-3 | Carreno (VEN); W 5-1 | | 9 |

Knock-Out Stage

| Athlete | Event | Round of 16 | Quarterfinals | Semifinals | Final | Rank |
|---|---|---|---|---|---|---|
| Marco Fichera | Boys’ Épée | | Ciovica (ROU); W 15-14 | Lyssov (CAN); W 15-6 | Bodoczi (GER); W 15-14 | Gold medal |
| Edoardo Luperi | Boys’ Foil | | Choupenitch (CZE); W 15-7 | Babaoğlu (TUR); W 15-8 | Massialas (USA); W 15-11 | Gold medal |
| Leonardo Affede | Boys’ Sabre | | Spear (USA); W 15-9 | Akula (BLR); W 15-12 | Song (KOR); L 8-15 | Silver medal |
| Alberta Santuccio | Girls’ Épée | Tella (ARG); W 15-7 | Bakhareva (RUS); W 13-7 | Holmes (USA); W 9-8 | Lin (CHN); L 8-9 | Silver medal |
| Camilla Mancini | Girls’ Foil | Jaoude (LIB); W 15-7 | Shaito (USA); W 15-10 | Goldie (CAN); W 15-9 | Alexeeva (RUS); W 15-9 | Gold medal |
| Victoria Ciardullo | Girls’ Sabre | Ahmed (EGY); L 6-15 | Did not advance | | | 9 |
| Europe 1 Yana Egoryan (RUS); Marco Fichera (ITA); Camilla Mancini (ITA); Leonardo Affede (ITA); Alberta Santuccio (ITA); Edoardo Luperi (ITA) | Mixed Team | | Americas 2 W 30-17 | Americas 1 W 30-25 | Europe 2 W 30-24 | Gold medal |

== Gymnastics ==
=== Artistic Gymnastics ===
Boys

| Athlete | Event | Floor | | Pommel Horse | | Rings | | Vault | | Parallel Bars | | Horizontal Bar | | Total | |
| Athlete | Event | Score | Rank | Score | Rank | Score | Rank | Score | Rank | Score | Rank | Score | Rank | Score | Rank |
|---|---|---|---|---|---|---|---|---|---|---|---|---|---|---|---|
| Ludovico Edalli | Boys' Qualification | 13.750 | 17 | 13.450 | 13 | 13.400 | 22 | 14.800 | 28 | 13.900 | 8 Q | 13.800 | 10 | 83.100 | 9 Q |
| Ludovico Edalli | Boys' Individual All-Around | 13.450 | 15 | 12.750 | 13 | 13.450 | 11 | 14.650 | 16 | 13.600 | 11 | 13.700 | 6 | 81.600 | 11 |

| Athlete | Event | Score | Rank |
|---|---|---|---|
| Ludovico Edalli | Boys' Parallel Bars | 14.100 | Bronze medal |

Girls

| Athlete | Event | Vault | | Uneven Bars | | Beam | | Floor | | Total | |
| Athlete | Event | Score | Rank | Score | Rank | Score | Rank | Score | Rank | Score | Rank |
|---|---|---|---|---|---|---|---|---|---|---|---|
| Carlotta Ferlito | Girls' Qualification | 14.200 | 2 Q | 13.400 | 6 Q | 14.650 | 3 Q | 13.500 | 4 Q | 55.750 | 3 Q |
| Carlotta Ferlito | Girls' Individual All-Around | 14.150 | 4 | 12.750 | 10 | 14.500 | 3 | 13.950 | 3 | 55.350 | Bronze medal |

| Athlete | Event | Score | Rank |
|---|---|---|---|
| Carlotta Ferlito | Girls' Vault | 13.700 | Bronze medal |
| Carlotta Ferlito | Girls' Uneven Bars | 12.725 | 6 |
| Carlotta Ferlito | Girls' Beam | 14.825 | Silver medal |
| Carlotta Ferlito | Girls' Floor | 12.900 | 8 |

== Judo ==
Individual

| Athlete | Event | Round 1 | Round 2 | Round 3 | Semifinals | Final | Rank |
| Athlete | Event | Opposition Result | Opposition Result | Opposition Result | Opposition Result | Opposition Result | Rank |
|---|---|---|---|---|---|---|---|
| Fabio Basile | Boys' -55 kg | Pulrabek (CZE); L 000-100 | Repechage; Anter (YEM); W 111-000 | | Repechage; Atanov (UKR); L 000-001 | Did not advance | 7 |
| Odette Giuffrida | Girls' -52 kg | Bouyssou (USA); L 000-011 | Repechage; Guica (CAN); W 012-000 | Repechage; Rosso-Richetto (FRA); L 000-001 | Did not advance | | 9 |

Team

| Team | Event | Round 1 | Round 2 | Semifinals | Final | Rank |
| Team | Event | Opposition Result | Opposition Result | Opposition Result | Opposition Result | Rank |
|---|---|---|---|---|---|---|
| Tokyo; Seul Bi Bae (KOR); Fabio Basile (ITA); Gaelle Nemorin (MRI); Patrik Ferriea Martins (AND); Rotem Shor (ISR); Kevin Fernandez (HON); Kseniya Darchuk (UKR); Batuhan Efemgil (TUR) | Mixed Team | Paris; W 5-3 | New York; W 4-4 (3-2) | Belgrade; L 3-5 | Did not advance | Bronze medal |
| Hamilton; Cynthia Rahming (BAH); Paolo Persoglia (SMR); Odette Giuffrida (ITA); Davit Ghazaryan (ARM); Wildjie Vertus (HAI); Jae Hyung Lee (KOR); Una Svetlana Tuba (SRB); Anis Shalabi (LBA) | Mixed Team | BYE | Cairo; L 4-4 (2-3) | Did not advance | | 5 |

== Modern pentathlon ==
| Athlete | Event | Fencing (Épée One Touch) | | | Swimming (200m Freestyle) | | | Running & Shooting (3000m, Laser Pistol) | | | Total Points | Final Rank |
| Athlete | Event | Results | Rank | Points | Time | Rank | Points | Time | Rank | Points | Total Points | Final Rank |
|---|---|---|---|---|---|---|---|---|---|---|---|---|
| Andrea Micalizzi | Boys' Individual | 8-15 | 19 | 680 | 2:07.36 | 6 | 1272 | 12:47.65 | 24 | 1932 | 3884 | 22 |
| Gloria Tocchi | Girls' Individual | 15-8 | 5 | 960 | 2:26.64 | 17 | 1044 | 13:28.70 | 15 | 1768 | 3772 | 11 |
| Gloria Tocchi (ITA); Andrea Micalizzi (ITA) | Mixed Relay | 47-45 | 10 | 830 | 2:04.80 | 11 | 1304 | 16:28.76 | 16 | 2128 | 4262 | 14 |

== Rowing ==
| Athlete | Event | Heats | | Repechage | | Semifinals | | Final | | Overall Rank |
| Athlete | Event | Time | Rank | Time | Rank | Time | Rank | Time | Rank | Overall Rank |
|---|---|---|---|---|---|---|---|---|---|---|
| Bernardo Nannini; Marco di Costanzo | Boys' Pair | 3:23.22 | 4 QR | 3:26.33 | 2 QA/B | 3:26.44 | 5 QB | 3:15.65 | 4 | 10 |
| Elena Coletti; Giada Colombo | Girls' Pair | 3:32.85 | 3 QA/B | | | 3:37.29 | 1 QA | 3:30.05 | 4 | 4 |

== Sailing ==
One Person Dinghy

| Athlete | Event | Race | | | | | | | | | | | | Points | Rank |
| Athlete | Event | 1 | 2 | 3 | 4 | 5 | 6 | 7 | 8 | 9 | 10 | 11 | M* | Points | Rank |
|---|---|---|---|---|---|---|---|---|---|---|---|---|---|---|---|
| Marco Benini | Boys' Byte CII | 3 | 12 | 16 | ~~22~~ | 5 | 4 | 15 | 1 | 12 | 18 | ~~24~~ | 6 | 92 | 9 |

Windsurfing

| Athlete | Event | Race | | | | | | | | | | | Points | Rank |
| Athlete | Event | 1 | 2 | 3 | 4 | 5 | 6 | 7 | 8 | 9 | 10 | M* | Points | Rank |
|---|---|---|---|---|---|---|---|---|---|---|---|---|---|---|
| Daniele Benedetti | Boys' Techno 293 | 8 | 11 | ~~14~~ | 7 | 4 | 6 | 8 | 9 | 8 | 14 | 12 | 87 | 9 |
| Veronica Fanciulli | Girls' Techno 293 | 2 | 3 | 9 | 12 | 1 | ~~OCS~~ | 3 | 2 | 2 | 4 | 1 | 39 | Silver medal |

== Shooting ==
Pistol

| Athlete | Event | Qualification | | Final | | |
| Athlete | Event | Score | Rank | Score | Total | Rank |
|---|---|---|---|---|---|---|
| Chiara Marini | Girls' 10m Air Pistol | 373 | 8 Q | 93.6 | 466.6 | 7 |

Rifle

| Athlete | Event | Qualification | | Final | | |
| Athlete | Event | Score | Rank | Score | Total | Rank |
|---|---|---|---|---|---|---|
| Simon Weithaler | Boys' 10m Air Rifle | 590 | 4 Q | 97.8 | 687.8 | 7 |

== Swimming ==
Boys

| Athletes | Event | Heat | | Semifinal | | Final | |
| Athletes | Event | Time | Position | Time | Position | Time | Position |
|---|---|---|---|---|---|---|---|
| Tommaso Romani | Boys’ 50m Freestyle | DNS | | Did not advance | | | |
| Tommaso Romani | Boys’ 100m Freestyle | DNS | | Did not advance | | | |
| Tommaso Romani | Boys’ 50m Butterfly | 25.15 | 5 Q | 24.93 | 5 Q | 24.80 | Bronze medal |
| Tommaso Romani | Boys’ 100m Butterfly | 55.10 | 11 Q | 54.35 | 9 | Did not advance | |
| Alessio Torlai | Boys’ 100m Freestyle | 52.71 | 29 | Did not advance | | | |
| Alessio Torlai | Boys’ 200m Freestyle | 1:54.11 | 18 | | | Did not advance | |
| Alessio Torlai | Boys’ 200m Butterfly | DNS | | | | Did not advance | |
| Simone Geni | Boys’ 100m Backstroke | 58.53 | 16 Q | Withdrew | | Did not advance | |
| Simone Geni | Boys’ 200m Individual Medley | 2:04.68 | 10 | | | Did not advance | |
| Flavio Bizzarri | Boys’ 50m Breaststroke | 29.41 | 6 Q | 29.46 | 7 Q | 29.56 | 7 |
| Flavio Bizzarri | Boys’ 100m Breaststroke | 1:03.14 | 2 Q | 1:02.39 | 2 Q | 1:02.22 | Bronze medal |
| Flavio Bizzarri | Boys’ 200m Breaststroke | 2:18.22 | 6 Q | | | 2:13.31 | Gold medal |
| Simone Geni; Flavio Bizzarri; Tommaso Romani; Alessio Torlai | Boys’ 4 × 100 m Freestyle Relay | DNS | | | | Did not advance | |
| Simone Geni; Flavio Bizzarri; Tommaso Romani; Alessio Torlai | Boys’ 4 × 100 m Medley Relay | 3:49.80 | 8 Q | | | 3:48.45 | 8 |

Girls

| Athletes | Event | Heat | | Semifinal | | Final | |
| Athletes | Event | Time | Position | Time | Position | Time | Position |
|---|---|---|---|---|---|---|---|
| Elena di Liddo | Girls’ 100m Freestyle | DNS | | Did not advance | | | |
| Elena di Liddo | Girls’ 50m Butterfly | 27.25 | 1 Q | 26.88 | 1 Q | 27.06 | Silver medal |
| Elena di Liddo | Girls’ 100m Butterfly | 1:00.98 | 3 Q | 1:00.95 | 4 Q | DSQ | |
| Stefania Pirozzi | Girls’ 400m Freestyle | 4:18.36 | 4 Q | | | 4:14.61 | 4 |
| Stefania Pirozzi | Girls’ 200m Butterfly | 2:15.59 | 10 | | | Did not advance | |
| Stefania Pirozzi | Girls’ 200m Individual Medley | 2:20.94 | 7 Q | | | 2:19.91 | 7 |
| Martina Carraro | Girls’ 50m Breaststroke | 32.69 | 3 Q | 32.23 | 2 Q | 32.44 | Silver medal |
| Martina Carraro | Girls’ 100m Breaststroke | 1:13.09 | 12 Q | 1:11.76 | 8 Q | 1:10.95 | 6 |
| Martina Carraro | Girls’ 200m Breaststroke | 2:43.91 | 17 | | | Did not advance | |
| Alessia Polieri | Girls’ 100m Butterfly | 1:01.49 | 9 Q | 1:01.44 | 9 | Did not advance | |
| Alessia Polieri | Girls’ 200m Butterfly | 2:14.14 | 4 Q | | | 2:15.01 | 7 |
| Elena di Liddo; Stefania Pirozzi; Martina Carraro; Alessia Polieri | Girls’ 4 × 100 m Freestyle Relay | DNS | | | | Did not advance | |
| Elena di Liddo; Stefania Pirozzi; Martina Carraro; Alessia Polieri | Girls’ 4 × 100 m Medley Relay | DNS | | | | Did not advance | |

Mixed

| Athletes | Event | Heat | | Semifinal | | Final | |
| Athletes | Event | Time | Position | Time | Position | Time | Position |
|---|---|---|---|---|---|---|---|
| Alessio Torlai; Elena di Liddo; Alessia Polieri; Tommaso Romani | Mixed 4 × 100 m Freestyle Relay | 3:42.44 | 11 | | | Did not advance | |
| Flavio Bizzarri; Simone Gene; Stefania Pirozzi; Alessia Polieri | Mixed 4 × 100 m Medley Relay | DNS | | | | Did not advance | |

== Table tennis ==
Individual

| Athlete | Event | Round 1 | | Round 2 | | Quarterfinals | Semifinals | Final | Rank |
| Athlete | Event | Group Matches | Rank | Group Matches | Rank | Quarterfinals | Semifinals | Final | Rank |
|---|---|---|---|---|---|---|---|---|---|
| Leonardo Mutti | Boys' singles | Letigeb (AUT); L 1-3 (8-11, 5-11, 13-11, 8-11) | 3 qB | Massah (MAW); W 3-0 (11-7, 11-2, 11-3) | 2 | Did not advance | | | 21 |
| Leonardo Mutti | Boys' singles | Vanrossomme (BEL); L 1-3 (11-6, 4-11, 8-11, 10-12) | 3 qB | Bedair (EGY); L 1-3 (11-6, 4-11, 6-11, 9-11) | 2 | Did not advance | | | 21 |
| Leonardo Mutti | Boys' singles | Das (IND); W 3-1 (9-11, 15-13, 11-6, 11-7) | 3 qB | Marakkala (SRI); W 3-0 (13-11, 11-5, 11-6) | 2 | Did not advance | | | 21 |

Team

| Athlete | Event | Round 1 | | Round 2 | Quarterfinals | Semifinals | Final | Rank |
| Athlete | Event | Group Matches | Rank | Round 2 | Quarterfinals | Semifinals | Final | Rank |
|---|---|---|---|---|---|---|---|---|
| Europe 3 Alice Loveridge (GBR); Leonardo Mutti (ITA) | Mixed team | Africa 2 Ivoso (CGO); Kam (MRI); W 3-0 (3-0, 3-0, 3-1) | 3 qB | Intercontinental 3 Phan (AUS); Mejía (ESA); W 2-0 (3-2, 3-0) | Pan America 2 Cordero (PUR); Saragovi (ARG); W 2-1 (2-3, 3-2, 3-1) | Did not advance | | 17 |
| Europe 3 Alice Loveridge (GBR); Leonardo Mutti (ITA) | Mixed team | Europe 1 Szocs (ROU); Soderlund (SWE); L 1-2 (0-3, 3-2, 1-3) | 3 qB | Intercontinental 3 Phan (AUS); Mejía (ESA); W 2-0 (3-2, 3-0) | Pan America 2 Cordero (PUR); Saragovi (ARG); W 2-1 (2-3, 3-2, 3-1) | Did not advance | | 17 |
| Europe 3 Alice Loveridge (GBR); Leonardo Mutti (ITA) | Mixed team | Europe 4 Bliznet (MDA); Kulpa (POL); L 1-2 (0-3, 3-0, 1-3) | 3 qB | Intercontinental 3 Phan (AUS); Mejía (ESA); W 2-0 (3-2, 3-0) | Pan America 2 Cordero (PUR); Saragovi (ARG); W 2-1 (2-3, 3-2, 3-1) | Did not advance | | 17 |

== Tennis ==
Singles

| Athlete | Event | Round 1 | Round 2 | Quarterfinals | Semifinals | Final | Rank |
|---|---|---|---|---|---|---|---|
| Alessandro Colella | Boys' singles | Galeamo (PAR); W 2-1 (5-7, 6-2, 6-3) | Golding (GBR); L 0-2 (2-6, 1-6) | Did not advance | | | |

Doubles

| Athlete | Event | Round 1 | Quarterfinals | Semifinals | Final | Rank |
|---|---|---|---|---|---|---|
| Alessandro Colella (ITA); John Morrissey (IRL) | Boys' doubles | Horanský (SVK); Kovalík (SVK); L 0-2 (2-6, 5-7) | Did not advance | | | |

== Taekwondo ==
| Athlete | Event | Quarterfinal | Semifinal | Final | Rank |
|---|---|---|---|---|---|
| Vittorio Rega | Boys' -48kg | Lucas Guzman (ARG); L 1-2 | Did not advance | | 5 |

== Triathlon ==
Girls

| Triathlete | Event | Swimming | Transit 1 | Cycling | Transit 2 | Running | Total time | Rank |
|---|---|---|---|---|---|---|---|---|
| Alessia Orla | Individual | 9:33 | 0:33 | 34:24 | 0:29 | 21:14 | 1:06:13.69 | 19 |

Men's

| Athlete | Event | Swim (1.5 km) | Trans 1 | Bike (40 km) | Trans 2 | Run (10 km) | Total | Rank |
|---|---|---|---|---|---|---|---|---|
| Livio Molinari | Individual | 8:55 | 0:30 | 29:53 | 0:25 | 18:18 | 58:01.34 | 21 |

Mixed

| Athlete | Event | Total Times per Athlete (Swim 250 m, Bike 7 km, Run 1.7 km) | Total Group Time | Rank |
|---|---|---|---|---|
| Wan Qi Clara Wong (SIN); Livio Molinari (ITA); Cristina Luizzet Betancourt de Leon (PUR); Boyd Littleford (ZIM) | Mixed Team Relay; World Team 2 | 22:55; 19:36; 23:40; 21:23 | 1:27:34.96 | 12 |

== Weightlifting ==
| Athlete | Event | Snatch | Clean & Jerk | Total | Rank |
|---|---|---|---|---|---|
| Luca Parla | Boys' 77kg | 111 | 137 | 248 | 6 |
| Carlotta Brunelli | Girls' +63kg | 85 | - | DNF | |
