= South Korea at the 2010 Summer Youth Olympics =

- IOC code: KOR
- NOC: Korean Sport & Olympic Committee
- Website: www.sports.or.kr

in Singapore
- Competitors: 72 in 18 sports
- Flag bearer: Kim Jin Hak
- Medals Ranked 3rd: Gold 11 Silver 4 Bronze 4 Total 19

Summer Youth Olympics appearances (overview)
- 2010; 2014; 2018; 2026

South Korea participated in the 2010 Summer Youth Olympics in Singapore.

== Medalists ==
Medal	Name	Sport	Event	Date
Gold	Song Jong-hun	Fencing	Cadet Male Sabre	15 Aug
Gold	Chang Gyu-cheol	Swimming	Youth Men's 100m Butterfly	17 Aug
Gold	Seo Byeong-deok	Taekwondo	Men's 63kg	17 Aug
Gold	Jeon Soo-yeon	Taekwondo	Women's 63kg	18 Aug
Gold	Kim Jin-hak	Taekwondo	Men's 73kg	18 Aug
Gold	Kwak Ye-ji	Archery	Junior Women's Individual	20 Aug
Gold	Bae Seul-bi	Judo	Girls' 44kg	21 Aug
Gold	Kim Dae-beom	Modern Pentathlon	Boys' Individual	22 Aug
Gold	Lee Jae-hyung	Judo	Boys' 81kg	22 Aug
Gold	Kim Jang-mi	Shooting	10m Air Pistol Women Junior	23 Aug
Gold	Go Do-won	Shooting	10m Air Rifle Women Junior	25 Aug
Silver	Moon Jin-ju	Wrestling	Women's Freestyle 70kg	16 Aug
Silver	Chang Gyu-cheol	Swimming	Youth Men's 50m Butterfly	19 Aug
Silver	Boys' Handball Team: Choi Himin; Choi Hyeon Keun; Ha Min Ho; Hwang Do Yeop; Jang Insung; Kim Mingyu; Lee Han Sol; Lee Hyeon Sik; Lee Jeong Hwa; Lim Seung Hoon; Oh Sang Hwan; Park Hyung Geon; Yoo Hyun Ki; Yoo Sung Kyoung	Handball	Men	25 Aug
Silver	Kim Dong-hyun; Yang Ha-Eun	Table tennis	Mixed team	26 Aug
Bronze	Lee Kwang-hyun	Fencing	Cadet Male Foil	17 Aug
Bronze	Kang Ji-wook	Badminton	Boys' Singles	19 Aug
Bronze	Yang Ha-eun	Table tennis	Women's Singles	23 Aug
Bronze	Choi Dae-han	Shooting	10m Air Pistol Men Junior	24 Aug
Bronze	Bae Seul-bi	Judo	Mixed Team	25 Aug

== Archery ==
Boys

Athlete	Event	Ranking Round		Round of 32	Round of 16	Quarterfinals	Semifinals	Final	
Athlete	Event	Score	Seed	Opposition Score	Opposition Score	Opposition Score	Opposition Score	Opposition Score	Rank
Min Beom Park	Boys’ Individual	651	2	Gyi (MYA); W 6-0	Muller (SUI); W 6-0	Sabry (EGY); L 3-7	Did not advance		6

Girls

Athlete	Event	Ranking Round		Round of 32	Round of 16	Quarterfinals	Semifinals	Final	
Athlete	Event	Score	Seed	Opposition Score	Opposition Score	Opposition Score	Opposition Score	Opposition Score	Rank
Ye Ji Kwak	Girls’ Individual	670	1	Cheok (SIN); W w/o	Custers (NED); W 7-1	Mirca (MDA); W 6-4	Avitia (MEX); W 6-4	Tan (TPE); W 6-2	Gold medal

Mixed Team

Athlete	Event	Partner	Round of 32	Round of 16	Quarterfinals	Semifinals	Final	
Athlete	Event	Partner	Opposition Score	Opposition Score	Opposition Score	Opposition Score	Opposition Score	Rank
Min Beom Park	Mixed Team	Kristina Zaynutdinova (TJK)	Loh (SIN)/ Rivas (ESP); L 3-7	Did not advance				17
Ye Ji Kwak	Mixed Team	Aung Gyi (MYA)	Filippi (ITA)/ Karoukin (BLR); L 0-6	Did not advance				17

== Athletics ==
=== Boys ===
Track and Road Events

Athletes	Event	Qualification		Final	
Athletes	Event	Result	Rank	Result	Rank
Dongbaek Choi	Boys’ 400m	49.20	15 qB	48.42	11
Masaki Nashimoto (JPN); Xie Zhenye (CHN); Abdullah Ahmed Abkar (KSA); Choi Dong-baek (KOR)	Boys’ Medley Relay			1:54.14	5

Field Events

Athletes	Event	Qualification		Final	
Athletes	Event	Result	Rank	Result	Rank
Haein Jung	Boys’ Long Jump	6.72	15 qB	6.81	12

=== Girls ===
Field Events

Athletes	Event	Qualification		Final	
Athletes	Event	Result	Rank	Result	Rank
Yelim Jeong	Girls’ Discus Throw	44.98	7 Q	43.19	8

== Badminton ==
Boys

Athlete	Event	Group Stage				Knock-Out Stage			
Athlete	Event	Match 1	Match 2	Match 3	Rank	Quarterfinal	Semifinal	Final	Rank
Kang Ji-wook	Boys’ Singles	Castillo (MEX) W 2-0 (21-12, 21-17)	Chongo (ZAM) W 2-0 (21-15, 21-14)	Lam (USA) W 2-0 (21-16, 21-9)	1 Q	Sukamta (INA) W 2-1 (21-11, 14-21, 21-13)	Kumar (IND) L 1-2 (21-19, 17-21, 17-21)	Bronze Medal Match; Loh (MAS) W WO	

Girls

Athlete	Event	Group Stage				Knock-Out Stage			
Athlete	Event	Match 1	Match 2	Match 3	Rank	Quarterfinal	Semifinal	Final	Rank
Choi Hye-in	Girls’ Singles	Vu (VIE) L 1-2 (21-13, 18-21, 12-21)	Fukuman (JPN) W 2-0 (21-15, 21-14)	Zharka (UKR) W 2-0 (21-6, 21-11)	2	Did not advance			

== Basketball ==
Girls

Squad List	Event	Group Stage		Placement Stage			Rank
Squad List	Event	Group A	Rank	1st-8th	5th-8th	7th-8th	Rank
Kye Lee Kang (C); Yu Jin Jeong; Yea Jin Cha; Ryeong Lee	Girls' Basketball	Russia; W 27-18	2	United States; L 10-34	Brazil; L 13-28	Germany; W 18-17	7
Kye Lee Kang (C); Yu Jin Jeong; Yea Jin Cha; Ryeong Lee	Girls' Basketball	Vanuatu; W 33-8	2	United States; L 10-34	Brazil; L 13-28	Germany; W 18-17	7
Kye Lee Kang (C); Yu Jin Jeong; Yea Jin Cha; Ryeong Lee	Girls' Basketball	Canada; L 6-20	2	United States; L 10-34	Brazil; L 13-28	Germany; W 18-17	7
Kye Lee Kang (C); Yu Jin Jeong; Yea Jin Cha; Ryeong Lee	Girls' Basketball	Ivory Coast; W 22-15	2	United States; L 10-34	Brazil; L 13-28	Germany; W 18-17	7

== Fencing ==
Group Stage

Athlete	Event	Match 1	Match 2	Match 3	Match 4	Match 5	Match 6	Seed
Byeong Hun Na	Boys’ Épée	Godoy (CRC); W 5-1	Lyssov (CAN); L 3-5	Lim (SIN); W 5-2	Bodoczi (GER); L 2-5	Ciovica (ROU); W 5-1	Novotny (CZE); W 5-3	3
Kwang Hyun Lee	Boys’ Foil	Lichagin (RUS); W 5-1	Gyorgyi (HUN); W 5-3	Tofalides (GBR); L 1-5	Mahmoud (EGY); W 5-1	Luperi (ITA); L 0-5		4
Jong Hun Song	Boys’ Sabre	Szatmári (HUN); L 0-5	Spear (USA); L 1-5	Okunev (RUS); L 3-5	Mallette (CAN); L 3-5	Affede (ITA); L 4-5		12
Hye Won Lee	Girls’ Épée	Matshaya (RSA); W 5-2	Tataran (ROU); W 5-2	Bakhareva (RUS); L 4-5	Radford (GBR); L 3-5	Tella (ARG); W 5-2		5
Duk Ha Choi	Girls’ Foil	Barrera (ESA); L 2-5	Wong (SIN); W 5-1	Lupkovics (HUN); L 4-5	Wang (CHN); L 3-4	Cellerova (SVK); L 2-5		10
Ji Yeon Seo	Girls’ Sabre	Ciardullo (ITA); W 5-3	Boudad (FRA); W 5-2	Ahmed (EGY); W 5-3	Egoryan (RUS); W 5-3	Carreno (VEN); L 4-5		3

Knock-Out Stage

Athlete	Event	Round of 16	Quarterfinals	Semifinals	Final	Rank
Byeong Hun Na	Boys’ Épée		Zhakupov (KAZ); W 14-13	Bodoczi (GER); L 4-15	Lyssov (CAN); L 13-15	4
Kwang Hyun Lee	Boys’ Foil	Gyorgyi (HUN); W 15-8	Lichagin (RUS); W 15-10	Massialas (USA); L 8-15	Babaoglu (TUR); W 15-6	Bronze medal
Jong Hun Song	Boys’ Sabre	Szatmári (HUN); W 15-14	Zatko (FRA); W 15-11	Hubers (GER); W 15-11	Affede (ITA); W 15-8	Gold medal
Hye Won Lee	Girls’ Épée	Rahardja (SIN); W 15-10	Swatowska (POL); L 14-15	Did not advance		6
Duk Ha Choi	Girls’ Foil	Cellerova (SVK); L 13-15	Did not advance			10
Ji Yeon Seo	Girls’ Sabre		Egoryan (RUS); L 11-15	Did not advance		5
Asia-Oceania 1 Ji Yeon Seo (KOR); Byeong Hun Na (KOR); Ye Ying Liane Wong (SIN); Jong Hun Song (KOR); Lin Sheng (CHN); Kwang Hyun Lee (KOR)	Mixed Team		Europe 4 W 30-24	Europe 2 L 27-30	Americas 1 L 24-30	4
Asia-Oceania 2 Wan Yini (CHN); Kirill Zhakupov (KAZ); Wang Lianlian (CHN); Jackson Wang (HKG); Hye Won Lee (KOR); Nicholas Edward Choi (HKG)	Mixed Team		Europe 2 L 21-30	5th-8th Europe 4 L 20-30	7th-8th Americas 2 L 27-28	8

== Field hockey ==
Squad List	Event	Group Stage		Bronze Medal Match	
Squad List	Event	Opposition Score	Rank	Opposition Score	Rank
Mira Hong; Sol Kim; Daye Lee; Yong Seon Choi; Yuri Lee; Jihee Heo; Eeseul Baek; Mirae Kim; Jina Kang (C); Eunjung Park; So Ri Nam; Juhui Park; Suji Choi; Dayoung Jeong; Ju Young Lee; Yeseul Oh	Girls' Hockey	New Zealand; L 2-3	4	New Zealand; L 4-5	4
Mira Hong; Sol Kim; Daye Lee; Yong Seon Choi; Yuri Lee; Jihee Heo; Eeseul Baek; Mirae Kim; Jina Kang (C); Eunjung Park; So Ri Nam; Juhui Park; Suji Choi; Dayoung Jeong; Ju Young Lee; Yeseul Oh	Girls' Hockey	Argentina; L 1-4	4	New Zealand; L 4-5	4
Mira Hong; Sol Kim; Daye Lee; Yong Seon Choi; Yuri Lee; Jihee Heo; Eeseul Baek; Mirae Kim; Jina Kang (C); Eunjung Park; So Ri Nam; Juhui Park; Suji Choi; Dayoung Jeong; Ju Young Lee; Yeseul Oh	Girls' Hockey	South Africa; W 3-1	4	New Zealand; L 4-5	4
Mira Hong; Sol Kim; Daye Lee; Yong Seon Choi; Yuri Lee; Jihee Heo; Eeseul Baek; Mirae Kim; Jina Kang (C); Eunjung Park; So Ri Nam; Juhui Park; Suji Choi; Dayoung Jeong; Ju Young Lee; Yeseul Oh	Girls' Hockey	(Republic of Ireland) Ireland; W 3-2	4	New Zealand; L 4-5	4
Mira Hong; Sol Kim; Daye Lee; Yong Seon Choi; Yuri Lee; Jihee Heo; Eeseul Baek; Mirae Kim; Jina Kang (C); Eunjung Park; So Ri Nam; Juhui Park; Suji Choi; Dayoung Jeong; Ju Young Lee; Yeseul Oh	Girls' Hockey	Netherlands; T 2-2	4	New Zealand; L 4-5	4

== Gymnastics ==
=== Artistic Gymnastics ===
Boys

Athlete	Event	Floor		Pommel Horse		Rings		Vault		Parallel Bars		Horizontal Bar		Total	
Athlete	Event	Score	Rank	Score	Rank	Score	Rank	Score	Rank	Score	Rank	Score	Rank	Score	Rank
Yeonggwang Jo	Boys' Qualification	13.350	24	11.900	29	13.750	15	14.950	25	13.150	21	13.350	15	80.450	22

Girls

Athlete	Event	Vault		Uneven Bars		Beam		Floor		Total	
Athlete	Event	Score	Rank	Score	Rank	Score	Rank	Score	Rank	Score	Rank
Kyungjin Park	Girls' Qualification	13.650	11	12.450	16	12.750	20	11.600	33	50.450	18 Q
Kyungjin Park	Girls' Individual All-Around	13.600	11	11.000	18	13.250	10	11.650	17	49.500	16

== Handball ==
Squad List	Event	Group Stage		Semifinal	Final	Rank
Squad List	Event	Group A	Rank	Semifinal	Final	Rank
Mingyu Kim; Jeong Hwa Lee; Seung Hoon Lim; Hyeon Keun Choi; Sung Kyoung Yoo; Min Ho Ha; Han Sol Lee; Hyun Ki Yoo; Hyeon Sik Lee; Himin Choi; Hyung Geon Park; Sang Hwan Oh; Do Yeop Hwang; Insung Jang	Boys' Handball	Cook Islands; W 70-4	2 Q	Brazil; W 27-22	Egypt; L 25-35	Silver medal
Mingyu Kim; Jeong Hwa Lee; Seung Hoon Lim; Hyeon Keun Choi; Sung Kyoung Yoo; Min Ho Ha; Han Sol Lee; Hyun Ki Yoo; Hyeon Sik Lee; Himin Choi; Hyung Geon Park; Sang Hwan Oh; Do Yeop Hwang; Insung Jang	Boys' Handball	France; L 36-39	2 Q	Brazil; W 27-22	Egypt; L 25-35	Silver medal

== Judo ==
Individual

Athlete	Event	Round 1	Round 2	Round 3	Semifinals	Final	Rank
Athlete	Event	Opposition Result	Opposition Result	Opposition Result	Opposition Result	Opposition Result	Rank
Jae Hyung Lee	Boys' -81 kg	BYE	Ngambomo (COD); W 010-001		Ntanatsidis (GRE); W 111-000	Khalmurzaev (RUS); W 002-001	Gold medal
Seul Bi Bae	Girls' -44 kg	BYE	Damyanova (BUL); W 101-000		Cano (PER); W 100-000	Batizi (HUN); W 011-000	Gold medal

Team

Team	Event	Round 1	Round 2	Semifinals	Final	Rank
Team	Event	Opposition Result	Opposition Result	Opposition Result	Opposition Result	Rank
Hamilton; Cynthia Rahming (BAH); Paolo Persoglia (SMR); Odette Giuffrida (ITA); Davit Ghazaryan (ARM); Wildjie Vertus (HAI); Jae Hyung Lee (KOR); Una Svetlana Tuba (SRB); Anis Shalabi (LBA)	Mixed Team	BYE	Cairo; L 4-4 (2-3)	Did not advance		5
Tokyo; Seul Bi Bae (KOR); Fabio Basile (ITA); Gaelle Nemorin (MRI); Patrik Ferreira Martins (AND); Rotem Shor (ISR); Kevin Fernandez (HON); Kseniya Darchuk (UKR); Batuhan Efemgil (TUR)	Mixed Team	Paris; W 5-3	New York; W 4-4 (3-2)	Belgrade; L 3-5	Did not advance	Bronze medal

== Modern pentathlon ==
Athlete	Event	Fencing (Épée One Touch)			Swimming (200m Freestyle)			Running & Shooting (3000m, Laser Pistol)			Total Points	Final Rank
Athlete	Event	Results	Rank	Points	Time	Rank	Points	Time	Rank	Points	Total Points	Final Rank
Kim Dae-Beom	Boys' Individual	12-11	7	840	2:03.04	3	1324	10:44.35	2	2424	4588	Gold medal
Min Ji Choi	Girls' Individual	15-8	5	960	2:14.01	3	1192	13:56.35	17	1656	3808	8
Zhu Wenjing (CHN); Kim Dae-Beom (KOR)	Mixed Relay	50-42	6	860	2:02.99	5	1328	15:17.11	3	2412	4600	Silver medal
Min Ji Choi (KOR); Eslam Hamad (EGY)	Mixed Relay	44-48	15	800	2:00.06	3	1360	16:28.41	15	2128	4288	13

== Sailing ==
Windsurfing

Athlete	Event	Race											Points	Rank
Athlete	Event	1	2	3	4	5	6	7	8	9	10	M*	Points	Rank
Chaneui Kim	Boys' Techno 293	3	4	1	~~9~~	8	2	4	6	2	2	3	35	4

== Shooting ==
Pistol

Athlete	Event	Qualification		Final		
Athlete	Event	Score	Rank	Score	Total	Rank
Daehan Choi	Boys' 10m Air Pistol	571	7 Q	100.6	671.6	Bronze medal
Jang Mi Kim	Girls' 10m Air Pistol	378	1 Q	101.2	479.2	Gold medal

Rifle

Athlete	Event	Qualification		Final		
Athlete	Event	Score	Rank	Score	Total	Rank
Yong Kim	Boys' 10m Air Rifle	590	5 Q	102.6	692.6	4
Dowon Go	Girls' 10m Air Rifle	397	2 Q	103.1	500.1	Gold medal

== Swimming ==
Athletes	Event	Heat		Semifinal		Final	
Athletes	Event	Time	Position	Time	Position	Time	Position
Chang Gyu-Cheol	Boys’ 50m Butterfly	24.72	2 Q	24.63	2 Q	24.05	2nd place, silver medalist(s)
Chang Gyu-Cheol	Boys’ 100m Butterfly	54.66	5 Q	53.41	1 Q	53.13	1st place, gold medalist(s)
Chang Gyu-Cheol	Boys’ 200m Butterfly	2:02.50	7 Q			1:59.35	5
Yoo Kyu-Sang	Boys’ 100m Butterfly	55.58	15 Q	55.16	14	Did not advance	
Yoo Kyu-Sang	Boys’ 200m Butterfly	2:08.28	17			Did not advance	
Kim Hye-Jin	Girls’ 50m Breaststroke	DNS		Did not advance			
Kim Hye-Jin	Girls’ 200m Individual Medley	2:22.78	13			Did not advance	

== Table tennis ==
Individual

Athlete	Event	Round 1		Round 2		Quarterfinals	Semifinals	Final	Rank
Athlete	Event	Group Matches	Rank	Group Matches	Rank	Quarterfinals	Semifinals	Final	Rank
Dong Hyun Kim	Boys' Singles	Saragovi (ARG); W 3-0 (11-3, 11-8, 11-6)	2 Q	Lakatos (HUN); L 2-3 (8-11, 11-3, 5-11, 11-8, 8-11)	3	Did not advance			9
Dong Hyun Kim	Boys' Singles	Onaolapo (NGR); L 0-3 (9-11, 6-11, 12-14)	2 Q	Hageraats (NED); W 3-0 (11-5, 11-7, 15-13)	3	Did not advance			9
Dong Hyun Kim	Boys' Singles	Wu (NZL); W 3-0 (11-7, 11-2, 11-4)	2 Q	Niwa (JPN); L 1-3 (7-11, 4-11, 11-7, 3-11)	3	Did not advance			9
Ha Eun Yang	Girls' Singles	Pang (FRA); W 3-2 (7-11, 12-10, 11-7, 9-11, 11-5)	1 Q	Li (SIN); W 3-0 (11-8, 11-5, 11-5)	1 Q	Bliznet (MDA); W 4-0 (11-5, 11-9, 11-8, 13-11)	Gu (CHN); L 1-4 (8-11, 7-11, 7-11, 11-7, 2-11)	Sawettabut (THA); W 4-1 (9-11, 11-5, 11-4, 11-7, 11-6)	Bronze medal
Ha Eun Yang	Girls' Singles	Bliznet (MDA); W 3-0 (11-8, 11-5, 11-8)	1 Q	Jeger (CRO); L 1-3 (8-11, 6-11, 11-6, 8-11)	1 Q	Bliznet (MDA); W 4-0 (11-5, 11-9, 11-8, 13-11)	Gu (CHN); L 1-4 (8-11, 7-11, 7-11, 11-7, 2-11)	Sawettabut (THA); W 4-1 (9-11, 11-5, 11-4, 11-7, 11-6)	Bronze medal
Ha Eun Yang	Girls' Singles	Ivoso (CGO); W 3-0 (11-2, 11-4, 11-4)	1 Q	Hsing (USA); W 3-0 (11-8, 13-11, 11-6)	1 Q	Bliznet (MDA); W 4-0 (11-5, 11-9, 11-8, 13-11)	Gu (CHN); L 1-4 (8-11, 7-11, 7-11, 11-7, 2-11)	Sawettabut (THA); W 4-1 (9-11, 11-5, 11-4, 11-7, 11-6)	Bronze medal

Team

Athlete	Event	Round 1		Round 2	Quarterfinals	Semifinals	Final	Rank
Athlete	Event	Group Matches	Rank	Round 2	Quarterfinals	Semifinals	Final	Rank
Korea; Ha Eun Yang (KOR); Dong Hyun Kim (KOR)	Mixed Team	Europe 5 Baravok (BLR); Bajger (CZE); W 3-0 (3-1, 3-1, 3-0)	1 Q	Egypt; Meshref (EGY); Bedair (EGY); W 2-0 (3-1, 3-2)	Thailand; Sawettabut (THA); Santiwattanatarm (THA); W 2-0 (3-0, 3-1)	DPR Korea; Kim (PRK); Kim (PRK); W 2-0 (3-1, 3-1)	Japan; Tanioka (JPN); Niwa (JPN); L 1-2 (3-2, 2-3, 2-3)	Silver medal
Korea; Ha Eun Yang (KOR); Dong Hyun Kim (KOR)	Mixed Team	Hungary; Nagyvaradi (HUN); Lakatos (HUN); W 3-0 (3-0, 3-2, 3-0)	1 Q	Egypt; Meshref (EGY); Bedair (EGY); W 2-0 (3-1, 3-2)	Thailand; Sawettabut (THA); Santiwattanatarm (THA); W 2-0 (3-0, 3-1)	DPR Korea; Kim (PRK); Kim (PRK); W 2-0 (3-1, 3-1)	Japan; Tanioka (JPN); Niwa (JPN); L 1-2 (3-2, 2-3, 2-3)	Silver medal
Korea; Ha Eun Yang (KOR); Dong Hyun Kim (KOR)	Mixed Team	Intercontinental 4 Giardi (SMR); Massah (MAW); W 3-0 (3-0, 3-0, 3-0)	1 Q	Egypt; Meshref (EGY); Bedair (EGY); W 2-0 (3-1, 3-2)	Thailand; Sawettabut (THA); Santiwattanatarm (THA); W 2-0 (3-0, 3-1)	DPR Korea; Kim (PRK); Kim (PRK); W 2-0 (3-1, 3-1)	Japan; Tanioka (JPN); Niwa (JPN); L 1-2 (3-2, 2-3, 2-3)	Silver medal

== Taekwondo ==
Athlete	Event	Preliminary	Quarterfinal	Semifinal	Final	Rank
Byeong Deok Seo	Boys' -63kg	BYE	Lamine Bagayogo (BUR); W RSC R3 1:05	Alejandro Valdés (MEX); W 5-0	Mario Silva (POR); W 9-5	Gold medal
Jin Hak Kim	Boys' -73kg	BYE	Jia Zhe Christopher Lee (SIN); W 12-1	Maksym Dominishyn (UKR); W 6-4	Aliaskhab Sirazhov (RUS); W 6-4	Gold medal
So Hui Kim	Girls' -49kg	Jessie Bates (USA); L 6-9	Did not advance			9
Soo Yeon Jeon	Girls' -63kg	BYE	Rea Budic (CRO); W 11-3	Nagore Irigoien (ESP); W 2+-2	Antonia Katheder (GER); W 4-1	Gold medal

== Triathlon ==
Girls

Triathlete	Event	Swimming	Transit 1	Cycling	Transit 2	Running	Total time	Rank
Hee Sun Kim	Individual	10:05	0:36	Did not finish				

Men's

Athlete	Event	Swim (1.5 km)	Trans 1	Bike (40 km)	Trans 2	Run (10 km)	Total	Rank
Lee Ji Hong	Individual	9:13	0:32	30:36	0:23	17:44	58:28.81	24

Mixed

Athlete	Event	Total Times per Athlete (Swim 250 m, Bike 7 km, Run 1.7 km)	Total Group Time	Rank
Sato Yuka (JPN); Ji Hong Lee (KOR); Wai Sum Vincci Hui (HKG); Ru Cheng (CHN)	Mixed Team Relay; Asia 1	20:16; 20:06; 22:19; 20:39	1:23:20.88	8

== Weightlifting ==
Athlete	Event	Snatch	Clean & Jerk	Total	Rank
Yoon Hee Park	Girls' +63kg	102	125	227	6

== Wrestling ==
Freestyle

Athlete	Event	Pools		Final	Rank
Athlete	Event	Groups	Rank	Final	Rank
Jinju Moon	Girls' 70kg	Mohamed (EGY); W 2–0 (5–3, 1–0)	1	Yeats (CAN); L Fall (0–6)	Silver medal
Jinju Moon	Girls' 70kg	Kushkenova (KAZ); W Fall (3–0)	1	Yeats (CAN); L Fall (0–6)	Silver medal
Jinju Moon	Girls' 70kg	Ali (POL); W 2–1 (4–1, 0-1, 3–1)	1	Yeats (CAN); L Fall (0–6)	Silver medal

Greco-Roman

Athlete	Event	Pools		Final	Rank
Athlete	Event	Groups	Rank	Final	Rank
Junhyeong Choi	Boys' 85kg	Petrosyan (ARM); L Fall (0–3)	4	7th Place Match; Mweia (SOL); W 2–0 (w/o)	7
Junhyeong Choi	Boys' 85kg	Kamilov (UZB); L 1–2 (0–6, 2–0, 0-1)	4	7th Place Match; Mweia (SOL); W 2–0 (w/o)	7
Junhyeong Choi	Boys' 85kg	Adzhigov (RUS); L 0–2 (0–6, 2–6)	4	7th Place Match; Mweia (SOL); W 2–0 (w/o)	7
