= Taekwondo at the 2010 Summer Youth Olympics – Girls' 63 kg =

Taekwondo competition

The girls' 63 kg competition in taekwondo at the 2010 Summer Youth Olympics in Singapore took place on August 18. A total of 9 women competed in this event, limited to fighters whose body weight was less than 63 kilograms. Preliminaries started at 14:00, quarterfinals started at 14:48, semifinals at 18:30 and the final at 19:53. Two bronze medals were awarded at the Taekwondo competitions.

== Medalists ==
Gold	Soo Yeon Jeon; South Korea
Silver	Antonia Katheder; Germany
Bronze	Nagore Irigoien; Spain
Bronze	Samantha Silvestri; France

== Results ==
Legend

- PTG — Won by Points Gap
- SUP — Won by Superiority
- OT — Won on over time (Golden Point)

=== Main bracket ===
First round
Kadiatou Diallo (MLI)	RSC 1; 0:35
Rea Budić (CRO)

Quarterfinals
Soo Yeon Jeon (KOR)	11
Rea Budić (CRO)	3
Ana Perez (MEX)	4
Nagore Irigoien (ESP)	5
Antonia Katheder (GER)
Miloria Santos (TLS)	RSC 2; 1:12
Sephora Baelenge (COD)	1
Samantha Silvestri (FRA)	15

Semifinals
Soo Yeon Jeon (KOR)	2 (SUP)
Nagore Irigoien (ESP)	2
Antonia Katheder (GER)	12
Samantha Silvestri (FRA)	1

Final
Soo Yeon Jeon (KOR)	4
Antonia Katheder (GER)	1
