= Swimming at the 2010 Summer Youth Olympics – Boys' 4 × 100 metre medley relay =

Event

The boys' 4 × 100 metre medley relay event at the 2010 Youth Olympic Games took place on August 18, at the Singapore Sports School.

== Medalists ==
Australia	3:42.50
France	3:43.84
Germany	3:44.22

== Heats ==
=== Heat 1 ===
Rank	Lane	Nationality	Time	Notes
1	4	France	3:47.30	Q
2	3	China	3:48.49	Q
3	7	South Africa	3:48.89	Q
4	6	Hungary	3:49.19	Q
5	2	Japan	3:52.55	
6	5	Canada	3:58.65	

=== Heat 2 ===
Rank	Lane	Nationality	Time	Notes
1	4	Australia	3:45.05	Q
2	6	Germany	3:45.70	Q
3	7	Russia	3:46.48	Q
4	2	Italy	3:49.80	Q
5	5	Singapore	3:52.89	
6	1	United States	3:52.98	
	3	Brazil		DNS

== Final ==
Rank	Lane	Nationality	Time	Notes
1st place, gold medalist(s)	4	Australia	3:42.50	
2nd place, silver medalist(s)	6	France	3:43.84	
3rd place, bronze medalist(s)	5	Germany	3:44.22	
4	2	China	3:44.51	
5	3	Russia	3:44.65	
6	7	South Africa	3:45.80	
7	1	Hungary	3:47.27	
8	8	Italy	3:48.45	
