= Athletics at the 2010 Summer Youth Olympics – Girls' discus throw =

Athletics – Girls' discus throw at the I Summer Youth Olympic Games
- Venue: Bishan Stadium
- Date: August 17–21
- Competitors: 13 from 13 nations

Medalists
| 1st place, gold medalist(s) | | Shanice Craft | Germany |
| 2nd place, silver medalist(s) | | Krisztina Varadi | Hungary |
| 3rd place, bronze medalist(s) | | Heidi Schmidt | Sweden |

The girls' discus throw event at the 2010 Youth Olympic Games was held on 17–21 August 2010 in Bishan Stadium.

== Schedule ==
| Date | Time | Round |
|---|---|---|
| 17 August 2010 | 09:00 | Qualification |
| 21 August 2010 | 09:00 | Final |

== Results ==
=== Qualification ===
| Rank | Athlete | 1 | 2 | 3 | 4 | Result | Notes | Q |
|---|---|---|---|---|---|---|---|---|
| 1 | Shanice Craft (GER) | 52.89 | 51.33 | 54.10 | 53.15 | 54.10 | | FA |
| 2 | Simone Meyer (RSA) | 45.25 | x | x | 48.03 | 48.03 | | FA |
| 3 | Heidi Schmidt (SWE) | 46.35 | 47.20 | x | 44.94 | 47.20 | PB | FA |
| 4 | Krisztina Varadi (HUN) | x | 47.02 | 45.52 | x | 47.02 | | FA |
| 5 | Victoria Sadova (RUS) | x | x | 45.37 | 43.21 | 45.37 | | FA |
| 6 | Evangelia Psaraki (GRE) | 45.00 | x | x | 42.93 | 45.00 | | FA |
| 7 | Yelim Jeong (KOR) | 44.98 | x | 44.55 | 39.62 | 44.98 | | FA |
| 8 | Subenrat Insaeng (THA) | 44.96 | 44.20 | x | 43.17 | 44.96 | | FA |
| 9 | Sasha Gaye Marston (JAM) | 43.73 | x | x | 41.18 | 43.73 | | FB |
| 10 | Sarah Tolson (USA) | x | x | x | 42.58 | 42.58 | | FB |
| 11 | Volha Hladchanka (BLR) | 40.15 | x | 41.44 | x | 41.44 | | FB |
| 12 | Rahma Bouslama (TUN) | 38.57 | 37.68 | 38.33 | 39.46 | 39.46 | | FB |
| 13 | Ashley Arroyo Perez (PUR) | x | 37.39 | 36.96 | 38.55 | 38.55 | | FB |

=== Finals ===
==== Final B ====
| Rank | Athlete | 1 | 2 | 3 | 4 | Result | Notes |
|---|---|---|---|---|---|---|---|
| 1 | Sarah Tolson (USA) | 42.18 | 44.97 | 4-.18 | 43.61 | 44.97 | |
| 2 | Sasha Gaye Marston (JAM) | x | 40.14 | 40.36 | x | 40.36 | |
| 3 | Volha Hladchanka (BLR) | x | 36.78 | 39.85 | x | 39.85 | |
| 4 | Ashley Arroyo Perez (PUR) | x | 38.65 | 38.06 | 39.07 | 39.07 | |
| 5 | Rahma Bouslama (TUN) | 32.30 | 38.40 | 34.88 | x | 38.40 | |

==== Final A ====
| Rank | Athlete | 1 | 2 | 3 | 4 | Result | Notes |
|---|---|---|---|---|---|---|---|
| 1st place, gold medalist(s) | Shanice Craft (GER) | 53.31 | 50.55 | 51.47 | 55.49 | 55.49 | PB |
| 2nd place, silver medalist(s) | Krisztina Varadi (HUN) | x | 47.31 | 48.85 | 49.92 | 49.92 | |
| 3rd place, bronze medalist(s) | Heidi Schmidt (SWE) | 41.12 | x | 44.96 | 47.57 | 47.57 | PB |
| 4 | Simone Meyer (RSA) | x | x | 45.68 | 46.62 | 46.62 | |
| 5 | Subenrat Insaeng (THA) | 45.25 | 45.47 | x | x | 45.47 | |
| 6 | Evangelia Psaraki (GRE) | 43.31 | x | 44.64 | x | 44.64 | |
| 7 | Victoria Sadova (RUS) | x | 44.13 | 43.18 | 44.60 | 44.60 | |
| 8 | Yelim Jeong (KOR) | 40.68 | 38.83 | 41.58 | 43.19 | 43.19 | |
