= Fencing at the 2010 Summer Youth Olympics – Cadet male épée =

These are the results of the cadet male épée competition at the 2010 Summer Youth Olympics. The competition was held on August 16.

== Results ==
=== Pool Round ===
==== Pool 1 ====
| # | Name | Bouts | | | | | | | V | Ind | TG | TR | Diff | Rank |
| # | Name | 1 | 2 | 3 | 4 | 5 | 6 | 7 | V | Ind | TG | TR | Diff | Rank |
|---|---|---|---|---|---|---|---|---|---|---|---|---|---|---|
| 1 | Julian Godoy (CRC) | | 2D | 5V | 0D | 2D | 4D | 1D | 1 | 0.167 | 14 | 28 | -14 | 7 |
| 2 | Alexandre Lyssov (CAN) | 5V | | 3D | 5V | 5V | 4D | 5V | 4 | 0.667 | 27 | 21 | +6 | 3 |
| 3 | Lim Wei Hao (SIN) | 3D | 5V | | 0D | 4D | 3D | 2D | 1 | 0.167 | 17 | 27 | -10 | 6 |
| 4 | Nikolaus Bodoczi (GER) | 5V | 4D | 5V | | 0D | 5V | 5V | 4 | 0.667 | 24 | 13 | +11 | 1 |
| 5 | Lucian Ciovica (ROU) | 5V | 2D | 5V | 5V | | 3D | 1D | 3 | 0.500 | 21 | 21 | 0 | 5 |
| 6 | Ondrej Novotny (CZE) | 5V | 5V | 4V | 1D | 5V | | 3D | 4 | 0.667 | 23 | 24 | –1 | 4 |
| 7 | Byeong Hun Na (KOR) | 5V | 3D | 5V | 2D | 5V | 5V | | 4 | 0.667 | 25 | 17 | +8 | 2 |

==== Pool 2 ====
| # | Name | Bouts | | | | | | V | Ind | TG | TR | Diff | Rank |
| # | Name | 1 | 2 | 3 | 4 | 5 | 6 | V | Ind | TG | TR | Diff | Rank |
|---|---|---|---|---|---|---|---|---|---|---|---|---|---|
| 1 | Roman Svichkar (UKR) | | 2D | 5V | 2D | 4D | 2D | 1 | 0.200 | 15 | 24 | -9 | 6 |
| 2 | Kirill Zhakupov (KAZ) | 5V | | 4D | 3D | 5V | 5V | 3 | 0.600 | 22 | 17 | +5 | 2 |
| 3 | Marco Fichera (ITA) | 4D | 5V | | 5V | 5V | 5V | 4 | 0.800 | 24 | 14 | +10 | 1 |
| 4 | Tomasz Kruk (POL) | 5V | 5V | 3D | | 5V | 3D | 3 | 0.600 | 21 | 19 | +2 | 3 |
| 5 | Guilherme Melaragno (BRA) | 5V | 4D | 2D | 4D | | 4D | 1 | 0.200 | 19 | 24 | -15 | 5 |
| 6 | Saleh Saleh (EGY) | 5V | 1D | 0D | 5V | 5V | | 3 | 0.600 | 16 | 19 | –3 | 4 |

=== Bracket ===
Round of 16
1 | Marco Fichera (ITA)
16 | BYE
9 | Lucian Ciovica (ROU) | 15
8 | Saleh Saleh (EGY) | 5
5 | Ondrej Novotny (CZE) | 11
12 | Lim Wei Hao (SIN) | 15
13 | Julian Godoy (CRC) | 3
4 | Alexandre Lyssov (CAN) | 15
3 | Byeong Hun Na (KOR)
14 | BYE
11 | Roman Svichkar (UKR) | 14
6 | Kirill Zhakupov (KAZ) | 15
7 | Tomasz Kruk (POL) | 15
10 | Guilherme Melaragno (BRA) | 13
15 | BYE
2 | Nikolaus Bodoczi (GER)

Quarterfinals
1 | Marco Fichera (ITA) | 15
9 | Lucian Ciovica (ROU) | 14
12 | Lim Wei Hao (SIN) | 13
4 | Alexandre Lyssov (CAN) | 15
3 | Byeong Hun Na (KOR) | 14
6 | Kirill Zhakupov (KAZ) | 13
7 | Tomasz Kruk (POL) | 10
2 | Nikolaus Bodoczi (GER) | 15

Semifinals
1 | Marco Fichera (ITA) | 15
4 | Alexandre Lyssov (CAN) | 6
3 | Byeong Hun Na (KOR) | 4
2 | Nikolaus Bodoczi (GER) | 15

Final
1 | Marco Fichera (ITA) | 15
2 | Nikolaus Bodoczi (GER) | 14

| Bronze Medal |
| 4 | Alexandre Lyssov (CAN) | 15 |
| 3 | Byeong Hun Na (KOR) | 13 |

== Final standings ==
| Rank | Name | NOC | Team |
|---|---|---|---|
| 1st place, gold medalist(s) | Marco Fichera | Italy | Europe 1 |
| 2nd place, silver medalist(s) | Nikolaus Bodoczi | Germany | Europe 2 |
| 3rd place, bronze medalist(s) | Alexandre Lyssov | Canada | Americas 1 |
| 4 | Byeong Hun Na | South Korea | Asia 1 |
| 5 | Kirill Zhakupov | Kazakhstan | Asia 2 |
| 6 | Tomasz Kruk | Poland | Europe 3 |
| 7 | Lucian Ciovica | Romania | Europe 4 |
| 8 | Lim Wei Hao | Singapore | |
| 9 | Ondrej Novotny | Czech Republic | |
| 10 | Saleh Saleh | Egypt | Africa |
| 11 | Guilherme Melaragno | Brazil | Americas 2 |
| 12 | Roman Svichkar | Ukraine | |
| 13 | Julian Godoy | Costa Rica | |
