= Germany at the 2010 Summer Youth Olympics =

- IOC code: GER
- NOC: German Olympic Sports Confederation
- Website: www.dosb.de

in Singapore
- Competitors: 70 in 20 sports
- Flag bearer: Kieu Duong
- Medals Ranked 12th: Gold 4 Silver 9 Bronze 9 Total 22

Summer Youth Olympics appearances
- 2010; 2014; 2018

Germany participated in the 2010 Summer Youth Olympics in Singapore. The German squad consisted of 70 athletes competing in 20 sports: aquatics (swimming), archery, athletics, badminton, basketball, boxing, canoeing, fencing, gymnastics, judo, modern pentathlon, rowing, sailing, shooting, table tennis, taekwondo, tennis, triathlon, weightlifting and wrestling.

== Medalists ==
Medal	Name	Sport	Event	Date
Gold	Judith Sievers	Rowing	Junior Women's Single Sculls	18 Aug
Gold	Shanice Craft	Athletics	Girls' Discus throw	21 Aug
Gold	Lena Malkus	Athletics	Girls' Long jump	21 Aug
Gold	Artur Bril	Boxing	Men's Feather 57kg	25 Aug
Silver	Nikolaus Bodoczi	Fencing	Cadet Male Épée	16 Aug
Silver	Felix Bach	Rowing	Junior Men's Single Sculls	18 Aug
Silver	Antonia Katheder	Taekwondo	Women's 63kg	18 Aug
Silver	Anja Musch; Nikolaus Bodoczi; Richard Hübers	Fencing	Mixed team	18 Aug
Silver	Ibrahim Ahmadsei	Taekwondo	Youth Men's +73kg	19 Aug
Silver	Juliane Reinhold; Lena Kalla; Dorte Baumert; Lina Rathsack	Swimming	Youth Women's 4 × 100 m Freestyle Relay	19 Aug
Silver	Tom Liebscher	Canoeing	K1 Head to Head Canoe Sprint Men	22 Aug
Silver	Natalia Kubin	Judo	Girls' -78kg	23 Aug
Silver	Dennis Soeter	Canoeing	C1 Obstacle Canoe Slalom Men	25 Aug
Silver	Marius Piepke	Judo	Mixed Event	25 Aug
Silver	Florian Haufe	Sailing	Byte CII – Boys' One Person Dinghy	25 Aug
Bronze	Richard Hubers	Fencing	Cadet male sabre	15 Aug
Bronze	Anja Musch	Fencing	Cadet Female Sabre	16 Aug
Bronze	Dorte Baumert; Lina Rathsack; Lena Kalla; Juliane Reinhold	Swimming	Youth Women's 4 × 100 m Medley Relay	16 Aug
Bronze	Christian Diener; Christian vom Lehn; Melvin Herrmann; Kevin Leithold	Swimming	Youth Men's 4 × 100 m Medley Relay	18 Aug
Bronze	Dennis Lewke	Athletics	Boys' Shot put	22 Aug
Bronze	Patrick Domogala	Athletics	Boys' 200m	22 Aug
Bronze	Marius Piepke	Judo	Boys' -100kg	23 Aug
Bronze	Sonja Mosler	Athletics	Girls' Medley Relay	23 Aug
Bronze	Jana Berezko-Marggrander	Gymnastics	Girls' Rhythmic Individual All Around	25 Aug
Bronze	Constanze Stolz	Sailing	Byte CII – Girls' One Person Dinghy	25 Aug

== Archery ==
Girls

Athlete	Event	Ranking Round		Round of 32	Round of 16	Quarterfinals	Semifinals	Final	
Athlete	Event	Score	Seed	Opposition Score	Opposition Score	Opposition Score	Opposition Score	Opposition Score	Rank
Isabel Viehmeier	Girls' Individual	604	11	Shirian (IRI); W 6-2	Leek (USA); W 6-2	Segina (RUS); L 0-6	Did not advance		7

Mixed Team

Athlete	Event	Partner	Round of 32	Round of 16	Quarterfinals	Semifinals	Final	
Athlete	Event	Partner	Opposition Score	Opposition Score	Opposition Score	Opposition Score	Opposition Score	Rank
Isabel Viehmeier	Mixed Team	Timon Park (CAN)	Ingley (AUS)/ Koiwa (JPN); L 3-7	Did not advance				17

== Athletics ==
=== Boys ===
Track and Road Events

Athletes	Event	Qualification		Final	
Athletes	Event	Result	Rank	Result	Rank
Patrick Domogala	Boys' 200m	21.49	2 Q	21.36	Bronze medal
Lukas Schmitz	Boys' 400m	47.27	2 Q	48.70	8
Felix Franz	Boys' 400m Hurdles	52.95	5 Q	51.60	4

Field Events

Athletes	Event	Qualification		Final	
Athletes	Event	Result	Rank	Result	Rank
Dennis Lewke	Boys' Shot Put	20.23	5 Q	21.22	Bronze medal
Jonas Efferoth	Boys' Pole Vault	4.70	7 Q	4.85	4

=== Girls ===
Track and Road Events

Athletes	Event	Qualification		Final	
Athletes	Event	Result	Rank	Result	Rank
Rebekka Haase	Girls' 100m	11.90	6 Q	12.08	8
Sonja Mosler	Girls' 400m	54.86	6 Q	55.20	7
Hanna Klein	Girls' 1000m	2:46.93	6 Q	2:51.40	7
Franziska Hofmann	Girls' 100m Hurdles	13.97	7 Q	13.77	7
Annie Tagoe (GBR); Anna Bongiorni (ITA); Sonja Mosler (GER); Bianca Răzor (ROU)	Girls' medley relay			2:07.59	Bronze medal

Field Events

Athletes	Event	Qualification		Final	
Athletes	Event	Result	Rank	Result	Rank
Katinka Urbaniak	Girls' Shot Put	13.44	11 qB	14.15	9
Shanice Craft	Girls' Discus Throw	54.10	1 Q	55.49	Gold medal
Christin Hussong	Girls' Javelin Throw	49.96	2 Q	49.89	4
Lena Malkus	Girls' Long Jump	6.00	4 Q	6.40	Gold medal
Julia Diechmann	Girls' Triple Jump	11.89	11 qB	11.62	12
Melina Brenner	Girls' High Jump	1.73	9 qB	1.75	10
Michaela Donie	Girls' Pole Vault	3.80	7 Q	NM	

== Badminton ==
Girls

Athlete	Event	Group Stage				Knock-Out Stage			
Athlete	Event	Match 1	Match 2	Match 3	Rank	Quarterfinal	Semifinal	Final	Rank
Fabienne Deprez	Girls' Singles	Bangi (UGA) W 2-0 (21-10, 21-16)	Rasheed (MDV) W 2-0 (21-5, 21-7)	Clausen (DEN) L 1-2 (22-20, 18-21, 9-21)	2	Did not advance			

== Basketball ==
Girls

Squad List	Event	Group Stage		Placement Stage			Rank
Squad List	Event	Group B	Rank	1st-8th	5th-8th	7th-8th	Rank
Lena Gohlisch (C); Carolin Christen; Alexandra Hoffgen; Felicitas Grasshoff	Girls' Basketball	Singapore; W 33-22	2	Canada; L 15-33	Japan; L 18-28	South Korea; L 17-18	8
Lena Gohlisch (C); Carolin Christen; Alexandra Hoffgen; Felicitas Grasshoff	Girls' Basketball	United States; L 6-33	2	Canada; L 15-33	Japan; L 18-28	South Korea; L 17-18	8
Lena Gohlisch (C); Carolin Christen; Alexandra Hoffgen; Felicitas Grasshoff	Girls' Basketball	Belarus; W 15-13	2	Canada; L 15-33	Japan; L 18-28	South Korea; L 17-18	8
Lena Gohlisch (C); Carolin Christen; Alexandra Hoffgen; Felicitas Grasshoff	Girls' Basketball	Angola; W 26-17	2	Canada; L 15-33	Japan; L 18-28	South Korea; L 17-18	8

== Boxing ==
Boys

Athlete	Event	Preliminaries	Semifinals	Final	Rank
Artur Bril	Featherweight (57kg)		Denislav Suslekov (BUL); W 2+-2	Elvin Isayev (AZE); W 11-4	Gold medal
Thomas Vahrenholt	Lightweight (60kg)	Evaldas Petrauskas (LTU); L 2-6	Did not advance	5th Place Bout; Hrayr Matevosyan (ARM); L wd	6
Danis Radovan	Welterweight (69kg)	Islomzhon Dalibaev (KGZ); L 1-4	Did not advance	5th Place Bout; Ben Muziyo (ZAM); W 13-6	5

== Canoeing ==
Boys

Athlete	Event	Time Trial		Round 1	Round 2 (Rep)	Round 3	Round 4	Round 5	Final	Rank
Athlete	Event	Time	Rank	Round 1	Round 2 (Rep)	Round 3	Round 4	Round 5	Final	Rank
Dennis Soeter	Boys' C1 Slalom	1:39.39	2	Chimbumba (ANG); W 1:43.02-2:19.77		Babayan (ARM); W 1:39.44-2:08.22	Sokol (POL); W 1:40.23-1:56.92	Daniels (CAN); W 1:42.93-1:48.84	Wang (CHN); L 1:41.20-1:32.66	Silver medal
Dennis Soeter	Boys' C1 Sprint	2:47.52	14	Yemelyanov (KAZ); L 2:53.93-1:48.29	Burisa (CRO); L 2:42.83-2:08.64	Did not advance				
Tom Liebscher	Boys' K1 Slalom	1:53.21	19	Prskavec (CZE); L 1:40.32-1:29.69	Welh (LBR); W 1:39.82-2:11.71	Martin (GBR); L 1:42.72-1:36.96	Did not advance			
Tom Liebscher	Boys' K1 Sprint	1:32.80	4	Martin (GBR); W 1:30.66-1:49.52		Bernis (FRA); W 1:30.48-1:36.76	Jimenez (CUB); W 1:30.09-1:35.15	Tsarykovich (BLR); W 1:31.83-1:37.29	Totka (HUN); L 1:29.05-1:28.91	Silver medal

Girls

Athlete	Event	Time Trial		Round 1	Round 2 (Rep)	Round 3	Round 4	Round 5	Final
Athlete	Event	Time	Rank	Round 1	Round 2 (Rep)	Round 3	Round 4	Round 5	Final
Nathalie Grewelding	Girls' K1 Slalom	1:42.66	6	Farkasdi (HUN); W 1:41.60-2:04.21		Afef (TUN); W 1:44.47-2:00.26	Wolffhardt (AUT); L 1:43.94-1:39.00	Did not advance	
Nathalie Grewelding	Girls' K1 Sprint	DNS		Did not advance					

== Diving ==
Boys

Athlete	Event	Preliminary		Final	
Athlete	Event	Points	Rank	Points	Rank
Tim Pyritz	Boys' 3m Springboard	476.45	9 Q	524.45	6
Tim Pyritz	Boys' 10m Platform	467.50	4 Q	498.30	4

Girls

Athlete	Event	Preliminary		Final	
Athlete	Event	Points	Rank	Points	Rank
Kieu Duong	Girls' 3m Springboard	341.70	11 Q	387.70	7
Kieu Duong	Girls' 10m Platform	347.65	10 Q	388.95	5

== Fencing ==
Group Stage

Athlete	Event	Match 1	Match 2	Match 3	Match 4	Match 5	Match 6	Seed
Nikolaus Bodoczi	Boys' Épée	Godoy (CRC); W 5-0	Lyssov (CAN); L 4-5	Lim (SIN); W 5-0	Ciovica (ROU); L 0-5	Novotny (CZE); W 5-1	Na (KOR); W 5-2	2
Richard Hübers	Boys' Sabre	Zatko (FRA); L 4-5	Sirbu (ROU); W 5-4	Akula (BLR); W 5-2	Wang (HKG); W 5-1	Elsissy (EGY); W 5-1	Kondo (NIG); W 5-0	1
Anja Musch	Girls' Sabre	Merza (USA); L 2-5	Wan (CHN); L 3-5	Nyabileke (COD); W 5-4	Hilwiyah (IRQ); W 5-0	Wator (POL); W 5-3	Komaschuk (UKR); W 5-0	4

Knock-Out Stage

Athlete	Event	Round of 16	Quarterfinals	Semifinals	Final	Rank
Nikolaus Bodoczi	Boys' Épée		Kruk (POL); W 15-10	Na (KOR); W 15-4	Fichera (ITA); L 14-15	Silver medal
Richard Hübers	Girls' Épée		Sirbu (ROU); W 15-10	Song (KOR); L 11-15	Akula (BLR); W 15-13	Bronze medal
Anja Musch	Girls' Sabre	Nyabileke (COD); W 15-2	Wan (CHN); W 15-6	Merza (USA); L 10-15	Komaschuk (UKR); W 15-13	Bronze medal
Europe 2 Anja Musch (GER); Nikolaus Bodoczi (GER); Victoria Alekseeva (RUS); Richard Hübers (GER); Martyna Swatowska (POL); Tevfik Burak Babaoğlu (TUR)	Mixed Team		Asia-Oceania 2 W 30-21	Asia-Oceania 1 W 30-27	Europe 1 L 24-30	Silver medal

== Gymnastics ==
=== Artistic Gymnastics ===
Boys

Athlete	Event	Floor		Pommel Horse		Rings		Vault		Parallel Bars		Horizontal Bar		Total	
Athlete	Event	Score	Rank	Score	Rank	Score	Rank	Score	Rank	Score	Rank	Score	Rank	Score	Rank
Daniel Weinert	Boys' Qualification	13.850	11	13.050	20	13.100	28	14.650	36	13.650	11	13.300	16	81.600	15 Q
Daniel Weinert	Boys' Individual All-Around	13.800	9	13.450	4	13.250	14	14.700	14	13.450	13	13.350	12	82.000	9

Girls

Athlete	Event	Vault		Uneven Bars		Beam		Floor		Total	
Athlete	Event	Score	Rank	Score	Rank	Score	Rank	Score	Rank	Score	Rank
Desiree Baumert	Girls' Qualification	13.250	21	12.500	15	11.450	35	12.400	21	49.600	23

=== Rhythmic Gymnastics ===
Individual

Athlete	Event	Qualification						Final					
Athlete	Event	Rope	Hoop	Ball	Clubs	Total	Rank	Rope	Hoop	Ball	Clubs	Total	Rank
Jana Berezko-Marggrander	Girls' Individual All-Around	23.950	24.700	24.650	24.435	97.825	3 Q	24.350	24.200	25.225	25.100	98.875	Bronze medal

=== Trampoline ===
Athlete	Event	Qualification				Final	
Athlete	Event	Routine 1	Routine 2	Total	Rank	Routine 1	Rank
Oliver Amann	Boys' Trampoline	26.900	38.900	65.800	4 Q	38.500	5
Leonie Adam	Girls' Trampoline	26.400	10.800	37.200	12	Did not advance	

== Judo ==
Individual

Athlete	Event	Round 1	Round 2	Round 3	Semifinals	Final	Rank
Athlete	Event	Opposition Result	Opposition Result	Opposition Result	Opposition Result	Opposition Result	Rank
Marius Piepke	Boys' -100 kg	BYE	Vanoye (MEX); W 001-000		Nikiforov (BEL); L 000-101	Bronze Medal Match; Glusac (SRB); W 000*-000	
Natalia Kubin	Girls' -78 kg	BYE	Maxwell (BAR); W 100-000		Darchuk (UKR); W 101-000	Mansour (BEL); L 000-001	Silver medal

Team

Team	Event	Round 1	Round 2	Semifinals	Final	Rank
Team	Event	Opposition Result	Opposition Result	Opposition Result	Opposition Result	Rank
Belgrade; Anna Dmitrieva (RUS); Jeremy Saywell (MLT); Jennet Geldybayeva (TKM); Babacar Cisse (SEN); Haley Baxter (NZL); Dulguun Otgonbayar (MGL); Lola Mansour (BEL); Marius Piepke (GER)	Mixed Team	BYE	Osaka; W 4-4 (3-1)	Tokyo; W 5-3	Essen; L 1-6	Silver medal
Osaka; Sothea Sam (CAM); Abdulrahman Anter (YEM); Jing Fang Tang (SIN); Brandon Arends (ARU); Laura Naginskaitė (LTU); Alexios Ntanatsidis (GRE); Natalia Kubin (GER); Bruno Abel Villalba (ARG)	Mixed Team	Barcelona; W 5-3	Belgrade; L 4-4 (1-3)	Did not advance		5

== Modern pentathlon ==
Athlete	Event	Fencing (Épée One Touch)			Swimming (200m Freestyle)			Running & Shooting (3000m, Laser Pistol)			Total Points	Final Rank
Athlete	Event	Results	Rank	Points	Time	Rank	Points	Time	Rank	Points	Total Points	Final Rank
Eric Kruger	Boys' Individual	8-15	20	668	2:13.80	17	1196	11:15.01	7	2300	4164	15
Franziska Hanko	Girls' Individual	9-14	14	720	2:30.85	22	992	13:18.50	12	1808	3520	17
Tamara Vega (MEX); Eric Kruger (GER)	Mixed Relay	49-43	8	850	2:07.95	17	1268	15:23.66	4	2388	4506	5
Franziska Hanko (GER); Karol Dziudziek (POL)	Mixed Relay	44-48	15	800	2:09.59	20	1248	15:41.42	8	2316	4364	11

== Rowing ==
Athlete	Event	Heats		Repechage		Semifinals		Final		Overall Rank
Athlete	Event	Time	Rank	Time	Rank	Time	Rank	Time	Rank	Overall Rank
Felix Bach	Boys' Single Sculls	3:22.25	1 QA/B			3:23.15	1 QA	3:16.23	2	Silver medal
Judith Sievers	Girls' Single Sculls	3:45.41	1 QA/B			3:56.28	1 QA	3:44.21	1	Gold medal

== Sailing ==
One Person Dinghy

Athlete	Event	Race												Points	Rank
Athlete	Event	1	2	3	4	5	6	7	8	9	10	11	M*	Points	Rank
Florian Haufe	Boys' Byte CII	~~DSQ~~	6	7	9	4	1	7	9	3	7	~~10~~	7	60	Silver medal
Constanze Stolz	Girls' Byte CII	1	2	2	~~18~~	5	11	2	7	4	~~12~~	2	21	57	Bronze medal

== Shooting ==
Pistol

Athlete	Event	Qualification		Final		
Athlete	Event	Score	Rank	Score	Total	Rank
Philipp Kaefer	Boys' 10m Air Pistol	570	8 Q	100.1	670.1	5

Rifle

Athlete	Event	Qualification		Final		
Athlete	Event	Score	Rank	Score	Total	Rank
Alexander Thomas	Boys' 10m Air Rifle	588	6 Q	102.3	690.3	5
Yvonne Schlotterbeck	Girls' 10m Air Rifle	399	1 Q	98.8	497.8	4

== Swimming ==
Boys

Athletes	Event	Heat		Semifinal		Final	
Athletes	Event	Time	Position	Time	Position	Time	Position
Kevin Leithhold	Boys' 50m Freestyle	23.67	11 Q	23.35	8 Q	23.42	7
Kevin Leithhold	Boys' 100m Freestyle	51.01	3 Q	50.65	5 Q	50.93	7
Kevin Leithhold	Boys' 200m Freestyle	1:55.46	23			Did not advance	
Kevin Leithhold	Boys' 50m Butterfly	25.24	6 Q	24.92	4 Q	26.37	8
Christian Diener	Boys' 100m Backstroke	58.92	18	Did not advance			
Christian Diener	Boys' 200m Backstroke	2:05.44	9			Did not advance	
Christian vom Lehn	Boys' 100m Breaststroke	1:05.41	16 Q	1:05.23	15	Did not advance	
Christian vom Lehn	Boys' 200m Breaststroke	2:17.65	4 Q			2:16.03	4
Melvin Herrmann	Boys' 100m Butterfly	55.65	16 Q	55.19	15	Did not advance	
Melvin Herrmann	Boys' 200m Butterfly	2:06.83	16			Did not advance	
Christian Diener; Melvin Herrmann; Christian vom Lehn; Kevin Leithold	Boys' 4 × 100 m Freestyle Relay	3:30.55	9			Did not advance	
Christian Diener; Melvin Herrmann; Christian vom Lehn; Kevin Leithold	Boys' 4 × 100 m Medley Relay	3:45.70	2 Q			3:44.22	Bronze medal

Girls

Athletes	Event	Heat		Semifinal		Final	
Athletes	Event	Time	Position	Time	Position	Time	Position
Juliane Reinhold	Girls' 100m Freestyle	57.71	9 Q	57.64	10	Did not advance	
Juliane Reinhold	Girls' 200m Freestyle	2:04.09	8 Q			2:02.83	5
Dorte Baumert	Girls' 100m Backstroke	1:04.58	10 Q	1:04.36	10	Did not advance	
Dorte Baumert	Girls' 200m Backstroke	2:16.43	6 Q			2:16.15	6
Lina Rathsack	Girls' 50m Freestyle	27.07	16 Q	26.76	14	Did not advance	
Lina Rathsack	Girls' 50m Breaststroke	32.99	6 Q	32.73	5 Q	32.79	6
Lina Rathsack	Girls' 100m Breaststroke	1:13.08	11 Q	1:12.03	9	Did not advance	
Lina Rathsack	Girls' 200m Breaststroke	2:37.75	12			Did not advance	
Lena Kalla	Girls' 50m Butterfly	28.75	15 Q	28.31	11	Did not advance	
Lena Kalla	Girls' 100m Butterfly	1:01.71	10 Q	1:01.94	13	Did not advance	
Lena Kalla	Girls' 200m Butterfly	2:15.39	7 Q			2:14.11	6
Juliane Reinhold; Lena Kalla; Dorte Baumert; Lina Rathsack	Girls' 4 × 100 m Freestyle Relay	3:54.31	2 Q			3:49.02	Silver medal
Juliane Reinhold; Lena Kalla; Dorte Baumert; Lina Rathsack	Girls' 4 × 100 m Medley Relay	4:13.38	2 Q			4:11.76	Bronze medal

Mixed

Athletes	Event	Heat		Semifinal		Final	
Athletes	Event	Time	Position	Time	Position	Time	Position
Lena Kalla*; Melvin Herrmann; Juliane Reinhold; Kevin Leithhold; Lina Rathsack	Mixed 4 × 100 m Freestyle Relay	3:38.69	4 Q			3:36.06	5
Lena Kalla; Christian Diener; Kevin Leithhold; Lina Rathsack	Mixed 4 × 100 m Medley Relay	4:02.56	5 Q			DSQ	

- * raced in heats only

== Table tennis ==
Individual

Athlete	Event	Round 1		Round 2		Quarterfinals	Semifinals	Final	Rank
Athlete	Event	Group Matches	Rank	Group Matches	Rank	Quarterfinals	Semifinals	Final	Rank
Florian Wagner	Boys' singles	Mejía (ESA); L 2-3 (9-11, 4-11, 11-3, 11-8, 7-11)	4 qB	Santiwattanatarm (THA); L 0-3 (wd)	2	Did not advance			21
Florian Wagner	Boys' singles	Niwa (JPN); L 0-3 (7-11, 5-11, 7-11)	4 qB	Kam (MRI); W 3-1 (11-8, 9-11, 13-11, 11-7)	2	Did not advance			21
Florian Wagner	Boys' singles	Kulpa (POL); L 0-3 (5-11, 7-11, RET)	4 qB	Wu (NZL); W 3-1 (11-7, 11-4, 6-11, 11-9)	2	Did not advance			21
Petrissa Solja	Girls' Singles	Dropped out before tournament		Did not advance					

== Taekwondo ==
Athlete	Event	Preliminary	Quarterfinal	Semifinal	Final	Rank
Semih Gokemn	Boys' -48kg		Gregory English (USA); L 1-4	Did not advance		5
Tahir Gulec	Boys' -73kg	Christopher Deleage (MON); W 12-2	Maksym Dominishyn (UKR); L 8-12	Did not advance		5
Ibrahim Ahmadsei	Boys' +73kg		Aliaksandr Shmakau (BLR); W 6-5	Stefan Bozalo (CAN); W 4-3	Liu Chang (CHN); L 4-5	Silver medal
Antonia Katheder	Girls' -63kg	BYE	Miloria Santos (TLS); W RSC R2 1:12	Samantha Silvestri (FRA); W 12-1	Soo Yeo Jeon (KOR); L 1-4	Silver medal

== Tennis ==
Singles

Athlete	Event	Round 1	Round 2	Quarterfinals	Semifinals	Final	Rank
Peter Heller	Boys' Singles	Fernandes (BRA); L 1-2 (1-6, 7-5, 4-6)	Consolation; King (BAR); L 1-2 (6-4, 6-7, [7-10])	Did not advance			
Kevin Krawietz	Boys' Singles	Bhambri (IND); L 0-2 (3-6, 0-6)	Consolation; Wang (CHN); W 2-0 (7-5, RET)	Consolation; Acosta (ECU); L 1-2 (5-7, 6-2, [7-10])	Did not advance		
Anna-Lena Friedsam	Girls' Singles	Svitolina (UKR); L 1-2 (2-6, 6-4, 1-6)	Consolation; Erić (SRB); W 2-0 (w/o)	Consolation; Gámiz (VEN); W 2-1 (6-2, 5-7, [10-7])	Consolation; Mutaguchi (JPN); W 2-0 (6-0, 6-3)	Consolation; Ishizu (JPN); L 0-2 (2-6, 5-7)	

Doubles

Athlete	Event	Round 1	Quarterfinals	Semifinals	Final	Rank
Peter Heller (GER); Kevin Krawietz (GER)	Boys' Doubles	Fernandes (BRA); Olivo (ARG); L 0-2 (3-6, 5-7)	Did not advance			
Doroteja Erić (SRB); Anna-Lena Friedsam (GER)	Girls' Doubles	Tang (CHN); Zheng (CHN); L 1-2 (5-7, 6-2, [11-13])	Did not advance			

== Triathlon ==
Girls

Triathlete	Event	Swimming	Transit 1	Cycling	Transit 2	Running	Total time	Rank
Marlene Gomez Islinger	Individual	9:40	0:34	32:02	0:28	19:43	1:02:27.79	7

Men's

Athlete	Event	Swim (1.5 km)	Trans 1	Bike (40 km)	Trans 2	Run (10 km)	Total	Rank
Tobias Klesen	Individual	9:14	0:31	29:28	0:25	17:36	57:14.23	14

Mixed

Athlete	Event	Total Times per Athlete (Swim 250 m, Bike 7 km, Run 1.7 km)	Total Group Time	Rank
Monika Oražem (SLO); Gabor Hanko (HUN); Anna Godoy (ESP); Tobias Klesen (GER)	Mixed Team Relay; Europe 3	21:05; 19:29; 22:14; 20:01	1:22:49.66	6
Marlene Gomez (GER); Jeremy Obozil (FRA); Laura Casey (IRL); Lukas Kocar (CZE)	Mixed Team Relay; Europe 2	20:53; 19:47; 21:54; 19:37	1:22:11.38	4

== Weightlifting ==
Athlete	Event	Snatch	Clean & Jerk	Total	Rank
Nico Müller	Boys' 69kg	125	-	DNF	

== Wrestling ==
Freestyle

Athlete	Event	Pools		Final	Rank
Athlete	Event	Groups	Rank	Final	Rank
Laura Mertens	Girls' 46kg	Holland (AUS); W 2–0 (4–0, 3–0)	2	3rd Place Match; Olli (FIN); L 1–2 (4–2, 0–3, 0-1)	4
Laura Mertens	Girls' 46kg	Leorda (MDA); L 0–2 (0–4, 0–3)	2	3rd Place Match; Olli (FIN); L 1–2 (4–2, 0–3, 0-1)	4
Laura Mertens	Girls' 46kg	Gannouni (TUN); W 2–0 (4–1, 6–0)	2	3rd Place Match; Olli (FIN); L 1–2 (4–2, 0–3, 0-1)	4
