= El Salvador at the 2010 Summer Youth Olympics =

- IOC code: ESA
- NOC: Comité Olímpico de El Salvador

in Singapore
- Competitors: 4 in 4 sports
- Flag bearer: Gabriela Maria Dominguez Amaya

Summer Youth Olympics appearances
- 2010; 2014; 2018

El Salvador participated in the 2010 Summer Youth Olympics in Singapore.

== Fencing ==
Group stage

Athlete	Event	Match 1	Match 2	Match 3	Match 4	Match 5	Seed
Ivania Carballo Barrera	Girls’ Foil	Wong (SIN); L 2-5	Choi (KOR); W 5-2	Lupkovics (HUN); L 4-5	Wang (CHN); L 1-2	Cellerova (SVK); L 2-5	11

Knock-Out Stage

Athlete	Event	Round of 16	Quarterfinals	Semifinals	Final	Rank
Ivania Carballo Barrera	Girls’ Foil	Wong (SIN); L 12-15	Did not advance			11

== Gymnastics ==
=== Artistic Gymnastics ===
Girls

Athlete	Event	Vault		Uneven Bars		Beam		Floor		Total	
Athlete	Event	Score	Rank	Score	Rank	Score	Rank	Score	Rank	Score	Rank
Gabriela Maria Dominguez Amaya	Girls' Qualification	12.400	35	8.200	39	10.450	38	10.150	41	41.200	39

== Rowing ==
Athlete	Event	Heats		Repechage		Semifinals		Final		Overall Rank
Athlete	Event	Time	Rank	Time	Rank	Time	Rank	Time	Rank	Overall Rank
Roberto Lopez	Boys' Single Sculls	3:30.53	3 QR	3:35.36	3 QC/D	3:42.94	1 QC	3:33.72	1	12

== Table tennis ==
Individual

Athlete	Event	Round 1		Round 2		Quarterfinals	Semifinals	Final	Rank
Athlete	Event	Group Matches	Rank	Group Matches	Rank	Quarterfinals	Semifinals	Final	Rank
Luis Mejia	Boys' Singles	Wagner (GER); W 3-2 (11-9, 11-4, 3-11, 8-11, 11-7)	3 qB	Holikov (UZB); L 0-3 (5-11, 8-11, 7-11)	3	Did not advance			25
Luis Mejia	Boys' Singles	Kulpa (POL); L 0-3 (2-11, 10-12, 4-11)	3 qB	Gavilan (PAR); L 0-3 (12-14, 6-11, 9-11)	3	Did not advance			25
Luis Mejia	Boys' Singles	Niwa (JPN); L 0-3 (4-11, 5-11, 4-11)	3 qB	Das (IND); W 3-1 (12-10, 11-6, 6-11 11-9)	3	Did not advance			25

Team

Athlete	Event	Round 1		Round 2	Quarterfinals	Semifinals	Final	Rank
Athlete	Event	Group Matches	Rank	Round 2	Quarterfinals	Semifinals	Final	Rank
Intercontinental 3 Lily Phan (AUS); Luis Mejia (ESA)	Mixed Team	Europe 2 Xiao (POR); Vanrossomme (BEL); L 0-3 (0-3, 0-3, 0-3)	4 qB	Europe 3 Loveridge (GBR); Mutti (ITA); L 0-2 (2-3, 0-3)	Did not advance			25
Intercontinental 3 Lily Phan (AUS); Luis Mejia (ESA)	Mixed Team	Europe 6 Galic (SLO); Leitgeb (AUT); L 0-3 (0-3, 1-3, 0-3)	4 qB	Europe 3 Loveridge (GBR); Mutti (ITA); L 0-2 (2-3, 0-3)	Did not advance			25
Intercontinental 3 Lily Phan (AUS); Luis Mejia (ESA)	Mixed Team	France; Pang (FRA); Gauzy (FRA); L 0-3 (0-3, 0-3, 0-3)	4 qB	Europe 3 Loveridge (GBR); Mutti (ITA); L 0-2 (2-3, 0-3)	Did not advance			25
