= Fencing at the 2010 Summer Youth Olympics – Cadet female sabre =

These are the results of the cadet female saber competition at the 2010 Summer Youth Olympics. The competition was held on August 16.

== Results ==
=== Pool Round ===
==== Pool 1 ====
| # | Name | Bouts | | | | | | | V | Ind | TG | TR | Diff | Rank |
| # | Name | 1 | 2 | 3 | 4 | 5 | 6 | 7 | V | Ind | TG | TR | Diff | Rank |
|---|---|---|---|---|---|---|---|---|---|---|---|---|---|---|
| 1 | Celina Merza (USA) | | 5V | 5V | 5V | 5V | 5V | 4D | 5 | 0.833 | 29 | 11 | +18 | 1 |
| 2 | Wan Yini (CHN) | 3D | | 5V | 5V | 5V | 5V | 3D | 4 | 0.667 | 26 | 22 | +4 | 4 |
| 3 | Gracia Makwanya Nyabileke (COD) | 0D | 1D | | 4D | 4D | 0D | 2D | 0 | 0.000 | 11 | 30 | -19 | 7 |
| 4 | Anja Musch (GER) | 2D | 3D | 5V | | 5V | 5V | 5V | 4 | 0.667 | 25 | 17 | +8 | 3 |
| 5 | Ema Hilwiyah (IRQ) | 0D | 4D | 5V | 0D | | 0D | 0D | 1 | 0.167 | 9 | 29 | –20 | 6 |
| 6 | Angelika Wątor (POL) | 1D | 4D | 5V | 3D | 5V | | 3D | 2 | 0.333 | 21 | 20 | 1 | 5 |
| 7 | Alina Komashchuk (UKR) | 5V | 5V | 5V | 0D | 5V | 5V | | 5 | 0.833 | 25 | 17 | 8 | 2 |

==== Pool 2 ====
| # | Name | Bouts | | | | | | V | Ind | TG | TR | Diff | Rank |
| # | Name | 1 | 2 | 3 | 4 | 5 | 6 | V | Ind | TG | TR | Diff | Rank |
|---|---|---|---|---|---|---|---|---|---|---|---|---|---|
| 1 | Seo Ji-yeon (KOR) | | 5V | 5V | 5V | 5V | 4D | 4 | 0.800 | 24 | 16 | +8 | 1 |
| 2 | Victoria Ciardullo (ITA) | 3D | | 1D | 0D | 5V | 5V | 3 | 0.400 | 14 | 19 | -5 | 5 |
| 3 | Kenza Boudad (FRA) | 2D | 5V | | 5V | 3D | 5V | 3 | 0.600 | 20 | 16 | +4 | 3 |
| 4 | Mennatalla Yasser Ahmed (EGY) | 3D | 5V | 3D | | 0D | 5V | 2 | 0.400 | 16 | 19 | –3 | 4 |
| 5 | Yana Egorian (RUS) | 3D | 3D | 5V | 5V | | 5V | 3 | 0.600 | 21 | 16 | +5 | 2 |
| 6 | María Carreño (VEN) | 5V | 1D | 2D | 4D | 3D | | 1 | 0.200 | 15 | 24 | –9 | 6 |

=== Bracket ===
First round
9 | Victoria Ciardullo (ITA) | 6
8 | Mennatalla Yasser Ahmed (EGY) | 15
5 | Wan Yini (CHN) | 15
12 | Ema Hilwiyah (IRQ) | 1
13 | Gracia Makwanya Nyabileke (COD) | 2
4 | Anja Musch (GER) | 15
11 | María Carreño (VEN) | 7
6 | Yana Egorian (RUS) | 15
7 | Kenza Boudad (FRA) | 15
10 | Angelika Wątor (POL) | 13

Second round
1 | Celina Merza (USA) | 15
8 | Mennatalla Yasser Ahmed (EGY) | 4
5 | Wan Yini (CHN) | 6
4 | Anja Musch (GER) | 15
3 | Seo Ji-yeon (KOR) | 11
6 | Yana Egorian (RUS) | 15
7 | Kenza Boudad (FRA) | 10
2 | Alina Komashchuk (UKR) | 15

Semifinals
1 | Celina Merza (USA) | 15
4 | Anja Musch (GER) | 10
6 | Yana Egorian (RUS) | 15
2 | Alina Komashchuk (UKR) | 14

Final
1 | Celina Merza (USA) | 8
6 | Yana Egorian (RUS) | 15
Third place
4 | Anja Musch (GER) | 15
2 | Alina Komashchuk (UKR) | 13

== Final standings ==
| Rank | Name | NOC | Team |
|---|---|---|---|
| 1st place, gold medalist(s) | Yana Egorian | Russia | Europe 1 |
| 2nd place, silver medalist(s) | Celina Merza | United States | Americas 1 |
| 3rd place, bronze medalist(s) | Anja Musch | Germany | Europe 2 |
| 4 | Alina Komashchuk | Ukraine | Europe 3 |
| 5 | Seo Ji-yeon | South Korea | Asia 1 |
| 6 | Wan Yini | China | Asia 2 |
| 7 | Kenza Boudad | France | Europe 4 |
| 8 | Mennatalla Yasser Ahmed | Egypt | Africa |
| 9 | Victoria Ciardullo | Italy | |
| 10 | Angelika Wątor | Poland | |
| 11 | María Carreño | Venezuela | Americas 2 |
| 12 | Ema Hilwiyah | Iraq | |
| 13 | Gracia Makwanya Nyabileke | Democratic Republic of the Congo | |
