= Fencing at the 2010 Summer Youth Olympics – Cadet female foil =

These are the results of the cadet female foil competition at the 2010 Summer Youth Olympics. The competition was held on August 15.

== Results ==
=== Pool Round ===
==== Pool 1 ====
#	Name	Bouts							V	Ind	TG	TR	Diff	Rank
#	Name	1	2	3	4	5	6	7	V	Ind	TG	TR	Diff	Rank
1	Rita Abou Jaoude (LIB)		1D	0D	0D	1D	5V	2D	1	0.167	9	28	-19	6
2	Alanna Goldie (CAN)	5V		5V	5V	5V	5V	5V	6	1.000	30	9	+21	1
3	Victoria Alexeeva (RUS)	5V	3D		3D	5V	5V	5V	4	0.667	26	12	+14	2
4	Mona Shaito (USA)	5V	2D	5V		5V	5V	4D	4	0.667	26	14	+12	3
5	Menatalla Daw (EGY)	5V	0D	0D	1D		5V	0D	2	0.333	11	23	-12	5
6	Mame Ndao (SEN)	3D	1D	2D	0D	2D		1D	0	0.667	9	30	–21	7
7	Camilla Mancini (ITA)	5V	2D	0D	5V	5V	5V		4	0.667	22	17	+5	4

==== Pool 2 ====
#	Name	Bouts						V	Ind	TG	TR	Diff	Rank
#	Name	1	2	3	4	5	6	V	Ind	TG	TR	Diff	Rank
1	Ivania Carballo Barrera (ESA)		2D	5V	4D	1D	2D	1	0.200	14	19	-5	6
2	Wong Ye Ying Liane (SIN)	5V		1D	1D	5V	5V	3	0.600	17	14	+3	2
3	Choi Duk Ha (KOR)	2D	5V		4D	3D	2D	1	0.200	16	20	-4	5
4	Dóra Lupkovics (HUN)	5V	5V	5V		3D	5V	4	0.800	23	14	+9	1
5	Wang Lianlian (CHN)	2V	1D	4V	5V		0D	3	0.600	12	17	-5	4
6	Michala Cellerova (SVK)	5V	1D	5V	0D	5V		3	0.600	16	14	+2	3

=== Brackets ===
16th
1	Alanna Goldie (CAN)
16	BYE
9	Menatalla Daw (EGY)	4
8	Wang Lianlian (CHN)	15
5	Camilla Mancini (ITA)	15
12	Rita Abou Jaoude (LIB)	7
13	Mame Ndao (SEN)	1
4	Mona Shaito (USA)	15
3	Victoria Alexeeva (RUS)
14	BYE
11	Ivania Carballo Barrera (ESA)	12
6	Wong Ye Ying Liane (SIN)	15
7	Michala Cellerova (SVK)	15
10	Choi Duk Ha (KOR)	13
15	BYE
2	Dóra Lupkovics (HUN)

Quarterfinals
1	Alanna Goldie (CAN)	15
8	Wang Lianlian (CHN)	11
5	Camilla Mancini (ITA)	15
4	Mona Shaito (USA)	10
3	Victoria Alexeeva (RUS)	15
6	Wong Ye Ying Liane (SIN)	5
7	Michala Cellerova (SVK)	12
2	Dóra Lupkovics (HUN)	15

Semifinals
1	Alanna Goldie (CAN)	9
5	Camilla Mancini (ITA)	15
3	Victoria Alexeeva (RUS)	15
2	Dóra Lupkovics (HUN)	11

Final
5	Camilla Mancini (ITA)	15
3	Victoria Alexeeva (RUS)	9

Bronze Medal
1	Alanna Goldie (CAN)	10
2	Dóra Lupkovics (HUN)	15

== Final standings ==
Rank	Name	NOC	Team
1st place, gold medalist(s)	Camilla Mancini	Italy	Europe 1
2nd place, silver medalist(s)	Victoria Alexeeva	Russia	Europe 2
3rd place, bronze medalist(s)	Dóra Lupkovics	Hungary	Europe 3
4	Alanna Goldie	Canada	America 1
5	Mona Shaito	United States	America 2
6	Wong Ye Ying Liane	Singapore	Asia 1
7	Michala Cellerova	Slovakia	Europe 4
8	Wang Lianlian	China	Asia 2
9	Menatalla Daw	Egypt	Africa
10	Choi Duk Ha	South Korea	
11	Ivania Carballo Barrera	El Salvador	
12	Rita Abou Jaoude	Lebanon	
13	Mame Ndao	Senegal	
