= Fencing at the 2010 Summer Youth Olympics – Cadet male foil =

Results of a Summer Youth Olympics fencing event

These are the results of the cadet male foil competition at the 2010 Summer Youth Olympics. The competition was held on August 17.

== Results ==
=== Pool Round ===
==== Pool 1 ====
#	Name	Bouts							V	Ind	TG	TR	Diff	Rank
#	Name	1	2	3	4	5	6	7	V	Ind	TG	TR	Diff	Rank
1	Alexander Massialas (USA)		5V	5V	5V	5V	5V	5V	6	1.000	30	8	+22	1
2	Choi Nicholas Edward (HKG)	3D		5V	5V	4D	1D	5V	3	0.5000	23	23	0	3
3	Alexander Choupenitch (CZE)	1D	0D		5V	3D	5V	5V	3	0.500	19	21	-2	4
4	Alexandros Boeskov-Tsoronis (DEN)	2D	4D	3D		1D	3D	5V	1	0.167	18	26	-8	6
5	Tevfik Burak Babaoğlu (TUR)	0D	5V	5V	5V		5V	5V	5	0.833	25	17	+8	2
6	Redys Prades Rosabal (CUB)	2D	5V	2D	5V	3D		2D	2	0.333	19	24	–5	5
7	Ong Xian Shi Justin (SIN)	0D	4D	1D	1D	1D	5V		1	0.167	12	27	–15	7

==== Pool 2 ====
#	Name	Bouts						V	Ind	TG	TR	Diff	Rank
#	Name	1	2	3	4	5	6	V	Ind	TG	TR	Diff	Rank
1	Kirill Lichagin (RUS)		5V	5V	1D	5V	2D	3	0.600	18	21	-3	3
2	Antal Gyorgyi (HUN)	4D		0D	3D	2D	0D	0	0.000	9	25	-16	6
3	Alexander Tofalides (GBR)	4D	5V		5V	2D	3D	2	0.400	19	16	+3	4
4	Lee Kwang Hyun (KOR)	5V	5V	1D		5V	0D	3	0.600	16	15	+1	2
5	Mostafa Mahmoud (EGY)	3D	5V	5V	1D		2D	2	0.400	16	19	-3	5
6	Edoardo Luperi (ITA)	5V	5V	5V	5V	5V		5	1.000	25	7	+18	1

=== Bracket ===
Round of 16
1	Alexander Massialas (USA)
16	BYE
9	Mostafa Mahmoud (EGY)	9
8	Alexander Tofalides (GBR)	15
5	Kirill Lichagin (RUS)	15
12	Ong Xian Shi Justin (SIN)	10
13	Antal Gyorgyi (HUN)	8
4	Lee Kwang Hyun (KOR)	15
3	Tevfik Burak Babaoğlu (TUR)
14	BYE
11	Alexandros Boeskov-Tsoronis (DEN)	15
6	Choi Nicholas Edward (HKG)	9
7	Alexander Choupenitch (CZE)	15
10	Redys Prades Rosabal (CUB)	6
15	BYE
2	Edoardo Luperi (ITA)

Quarterfinals
1	Alexander Massialas (USA)	15
8	Alexander Tofalides (GBR)	12
5	Kirill Lichagin (RUS)	10
4	Lee Kwang Hyun (KOR)	15
3	Tevfik Burak Babaoğlu (TUR)	15
11	Alexandros Boeskov-Tsoronis (DEN)	9
7	Alexander Choupenitch (CZE)	7
2	Edoardo Luperi (ITA)	15

Semifinals
1	Alexander Massialas (USA)	15
4	Lee Kwang Hyun (KOR)	8
3	Tevfik Burak Babaoğlu (TUR)	8
2	Edoardo Luperi (ITA)	15

Final
1	Alexander Massialas (USA)	11
3	Edoardo Luperi (ITA)	15

Bronze Medal
4	Lee Kwang Hyun (KOR)	15
2	Tevfik Burak Babaoğlu (TUR)	6

== Final standings ==
Rank	Name	NOC	Team
1st place, gold medalist(s)	Edoardo Luperi	Italy	Europe 1
2nd place, silver medalist(s)	Alexander Massialas	United States	Americas 1
3rd place, bronze medalist(s)	Lee Kwang Hyun	South Korea	Asia 1
4	Tevfik Burak Babaoğlu	Turkey	Europe 2
5	Kirill Lichagin	Russia	Europe 3
6	Alexander Choupenitch	Czech Republic	Europe 4
7	Alexander Tofalides	Great Britain	
8	Alexandros Boeskov-Tsoronis	Denmark	
9	Choi Nicholas Edward	Hong Kong	Asia 2
10	Mostafa Mahmoud	Egypt	Africa
11	Redys Prades Rosabal	Cuba	Americas 2
12	Ong Xian Shi Justin	Singapore	
13	Antal Gyorgyi	Hungary	
