= Camilla Mancini =

Italian fencer (born 1994)

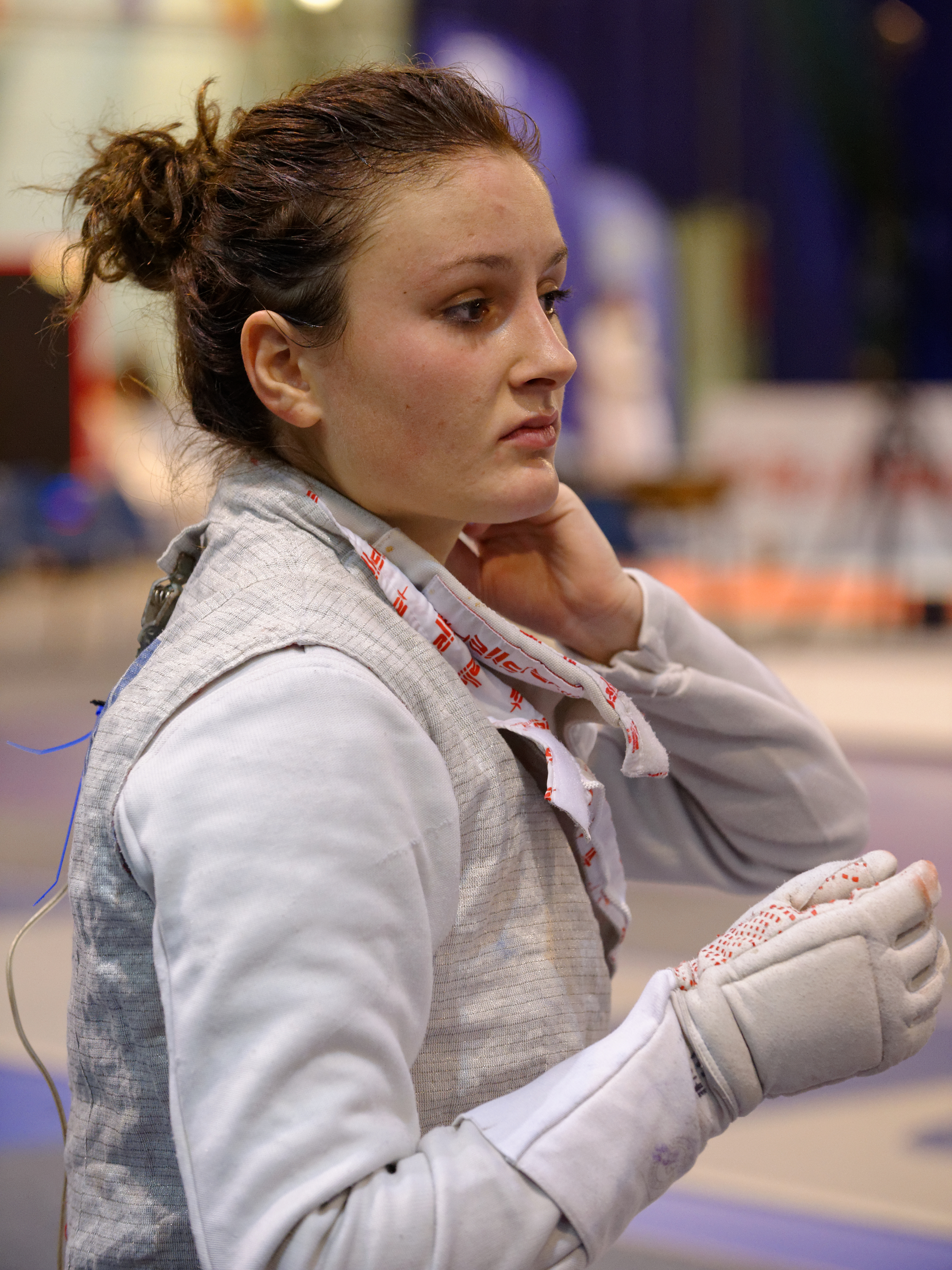

Personal information
- Nationality: Italian
- Born: 10 June 1994 (age 32) Rome

Sport
- Country: Italy
- Sport: Fencing
Medal record
Universiade
Bronze medal – third place	2019 Naples	Foil individual
Gold medal – first place	2015 Gwangju	Foil team
Gold medal – first place	2019 Naples	Foil team
World Championships
Gold medal – first place	2017 Leipzig	Foil team
Silver medal – second place	2018 Wuxi	Foil team

Camilla Mancini (born 10 June 1994) is an Italian fencer who won one gold medal and one bronze at the 2019 Summer Universiade.

== Career ==
She won the cadet girls' foil at the 2010 Youth Olympic Games. With the Italian team, she won a gold medal in team women's foil at the 2017 World Fencing Championships and silver at the 2018 World Fencing Championships.

== See also ==
- Italy at the 2019 Summer Universiade
