= Guilherme Melaragno =

Brazilian fencer

Personal information
- Born: 9 August 1993 (age 32)

Sport
- Sport: Fencing

Guilherme Melaragno (born 9 August 1993) is a Brazilian fencer. He competed in the men's épée event at the 2016 Summer Olympics.
