= Viktoria Alekseyeva =

Russian foil fencer (born 1994)

Victoria Alexeeva
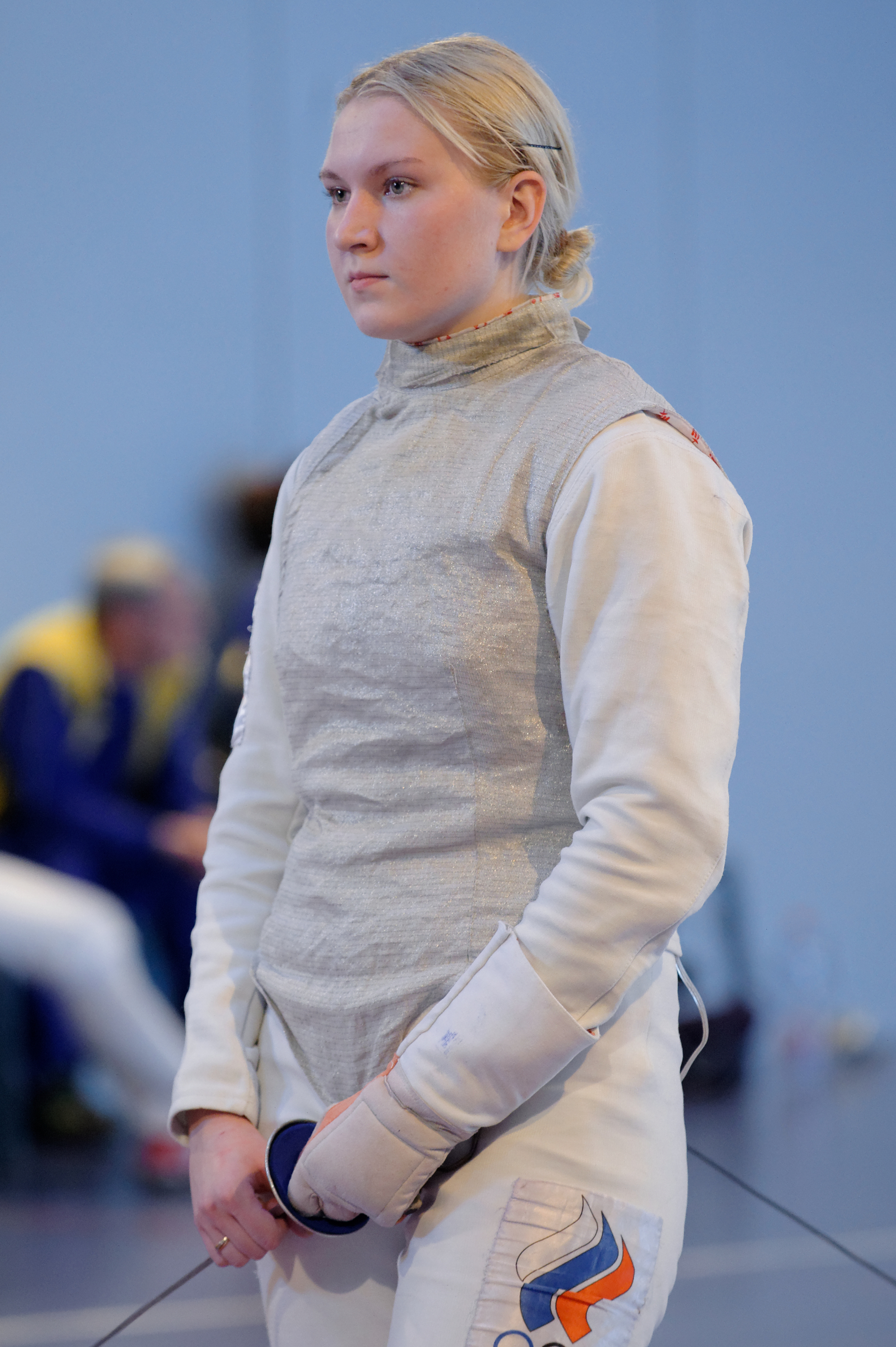
- Alexeeva in 2014

Personal information
- Born: August 2, 1994 (age 31)
- Home town: Kazan
- Height: 1.72 m (5 ft 8 in)
- Weight: 60 kg (130 lb)

Fencing career
- Sport: Fencing
- Country: Russia
- Weapon: Foil
- Hand: Left-handed
- FIE ranking: current ranking
Medal record
Women's foil fencing
Youth Olympic Games
Representing Russia
Silver medal – second place	2010 Singapore	Individual foil
Representing a mixed-NOCs team
Silver medal – second place	2010 Singapore	Mixed team foil

Viktoria Alexeeva (Russian: Виктория Алексеева; born August 2, 1994) is a Russian foil fencer. At the inaugural 2010 Youth Olympics in Singapore she won two silver medals, becoming the only Russian fencer ever achieving this feat.
