= Alexandre Lyssov =

Canadian fencer (born 1994)

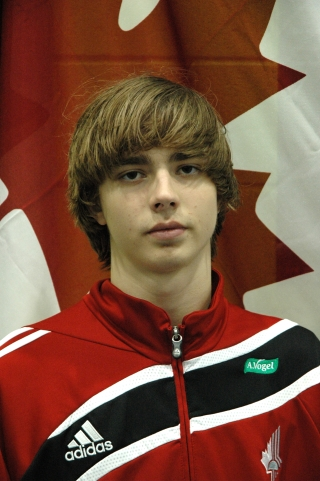
- Photo taken on September 30, 2010

Personal information
- Nickname: Alex
- Born: March 10, 1994 (age 32) Kaliningrad, Russia
- Height: 191 cm (6 ft 3 in)
- Weight: 72 kg (159 lb)

Fencing career
- Sport: Fencing
- Country: Canada
- Weapon: Épée
- Hand: Right-handed
- Former coach: Michel Dessureault, Andrew Hu, Peter Hiu-Man Ho, Marian Zakrzewski, Igor Tikhomirov
- FIE ranking: current ranking
Medal record
Men's Fencing
Youth Olympic Games
Representing Canada
Bronze medal – third place	2010 Singapore	Individual
Representing a mixed-NOCs team
Bronze medal – third place	2010 Singapore	Mixed team

Alexandre Lyssov (born March 10, 1994) is a Canadian épée fencer. At the inaugural 2010 Youth Olympics in Singapore he became the first ever Canadian fencer to step onto the Olympic podium and also the only fencer from Canada who won two Olympic branded medals.

== Fencing career highlights ==
Year	Competition	Event	Location	Placing
2022	Canadian National Championship	Men's Epée	Toronto, Canada	7
2017	Russian National Championship	Men's Épée	Smolensk, Russia	9
2014	Kupittaa tournament (SA)	Men's Épée	Turku, Finland	32
2013	Jeux du Canada	Men's Épée Individual	Sherbrook, QC	2nd place, silver medalist(s)
2013	Jeux du Canada	Men's Épée (Ontario Team)	Sherbrook, QC	2nd place, silver medalist(s)
2013	Vancouver Grand Prix	Senior Men's Épée Grand Prix	Vancouver, Canada	53
2013	Canadian National Championships	Senior Men's Épée	Gatineau, QC	15
2013	Canadian National Championships	Junior Men's Épée	Gatineau, QC	2nd place, silver medalist(s)
2012	Junior World Cup	Junior Men's Épée	Espoo, Finland	13
2012	Canadian National Championships	Senior Men's Épée Team	Saskatoon, SK	3rd place, bronze medalist(s)
2012	Canadian National Championships	Junior Men's Épée	Saskatoon, SK	3rd place, bronze medalist(s)
2012	Canadian Eastern Championships	Junior Men's Épée	Toronto, ON	1st place, gold medalist(s)
2012	Junior World Championships	Junior Men's Épée	Moscow, Russia	64
2011	Championnats de l'Est du Canada	Épée Masculine Cadet	Montréal, QC	1st place, gold medalist(s)
2011	Championnats de l'Est du Canada	Épée Masculine Junior	Montréal, QC	2nd place, silver medalist(s)
2010	1st Summer Youth Olympic Games	Cadet Male Épée	Singapore	3rd place, bronze medalist(s)
2010	1st Summer Youth Olympic Games	Mixed NOC's Team	Singapore	3rd place, bronze medalist(s)
2010	Cadet World Championships	Cadet Men's Épée	Baku, Azerbaijan	16
2010	Canadian National Championships	Cadet Men's Épée	Repentigny, QC	1st place, gold medalist(s)
2010	Ontario Provincial Championships	Cadet Men's Épée	Newmarket, ON	1st place, gold medalist(s)
2010	Ontario Provincial Championships	Junior Men's Épée	Newmarket, ON	2nd place, silver medalist(s)
2010	Championnat Provincial du Quebec	Épée Masculine Cadet	Montréal, QC	1st place, gold medalist(s)
2010	Championnat Provincial du Quebec	Épée Masculine Junior	Montréal, QC	3rd place, bronze medalist(s)
2010	Championnats de l'Est du Canada	Épée Masculine Cadet	Montréal, QC	2nd place, silver medalist(s)
2009	Canadian National Championships	Cadet Men's Épée	Saskatoon, SK	1st place, gold medalist(s)

=== Training history ===
Alexandre started going for sports at age of eight and completely switched to fencing at age of eleven. Initially he received instructions in foil and practised at community oriented clubs, but looking to gain a new level, he later switched to épée and continued his training under well known fencing masters.

From	To	Club	Coach(es)	Weapon(s)
June 2015	December 2015	Vango Fencing Club	Michel Dessureault, Andrew Hu	épée
Oct. 2009	May 2015	Toronto Fencing Club	Peter Hiu-Man Ho, Andrew Hu	épée
Mar. 2009	Sep. 2009	Sword Players Fencing Academy	Igor Tikhomirov	épée
Sep. 2007	Feb. 2009	Mississauga Fencing Club	Maître d'armes Marian Zakrzewski	foil, épée
Mar. 2006	Aug. 2007	Metro Blades	community coaching	foil
Nov. 2005	Feb. 2006	Newmarket Fencing Club	Michael MacDonald	introduction to fencing
