= Table tennis at the 2010 Summer Youth Olympics =

Table tennis at the I Summer Youth Olympic Games
- Venue: Singapore Indoor Stadium
- Dates: 21 – 26 August 2010
- No. of events: 3 (1 boys, 1 girls, 1 mixed)
- Competitors: 64 (32 boys, 32 girls) from 47 nations

The table tennis competition at the 2010 Summer Youth Olympics took place in Singapore Indoor Stadium between 21 and 26 August, with training hall set in National University of Singapore (NUS). 64 athletes composed of 32 boys and 32 girls at the age between 14 and 16 (born between 1 January 1994 and 31 December 1995) competed in different events of Men's Singles and Women's Singles. Further, each athlete paired with another athlete of the opposite sex participated in Mixed Team event. Each team match consisted of the best of three matches. The Women's Singles was played first, followed by Men's Singles and Mixed Doubles.

== Qualifiers ==
=== Singles ===
A total of 64 athletes qualified mainly from tournaments including ITTF Cadet Challenge, five ITTF Junior Circuit events, and five continental qualification tournaments (Africa, Asia, Europe, Pan America, Oceania). The others qualified from ITTF under 15 world ranking and the host National Olympic Committee (NOC). The maximum number of athletes per NOC was one man and one woman.

Event (Qualifiers)	Date	Location	Qualifiers	
Event (Qualifiers)	Date	Location	Men's Singles	Women's Singles
ITTF Cadet Challenge (4)	19–25 October 2009	(Japan) Tokyo	(China) Yin Hang (cancelled) (Japan) Koki Niwa (France) Simon Gauzy (Sweden) Hampus Soderlund (Tunisia) Adem Hmam (reallocated)	(South Korea) Yang Ha-Eun (Japan) Ayuka Tanioka (Romania) Bernadette Szocs (Thailand) Sutashini Sawetabut
African Qualification Tournament (2)	21–23 November 2009	(Egypt) Cairo	(Egypt) Bedair Omar (Nigeria) Ojo Onalaopo	(Egypt) Dina Mesheref (Algeria) Islem Laid
ITTF U-15 World Ranking (4)	31 December 2009	-	(Chinese Taipei) Hung Tzu-Hsiang (South Korea) Kim Dong-Hyun (Hong Kong) Chiu Chung Hei (Russia) Phillip Kumiov (rejected) (Czech Republic) Ondrej Bajger (reallocated)	(China) Gu Yuting (Germany) Petrissa Solja (Russia) Yana Noskova (Singapore) Isabelle Siyun LI
Pan American Qualification Tournament (3)	1–3 February 2010	(El Salvador) San Salvador	(Brazil) Jouti Eric (Ecuador) Rodrigo Tapia (Argentina) Pablo Saragovi	(United States) Ariel Hsing (Brazil) Caroline Kumahara (Puerto Rico) Carelyn Cordero
ITTF Specific Tournament (1)	6–7 February 2010	(Bahrain) Manama	(Belgium) Emilien Vanrossomme	(Netherlands) Britt Eerland
ITTF Specific Tournament (1)	14–15 February 2010	(Egypt) Cairo	(Italy) Leornado Mutti	(Moldova) Sofia Polcanova (rejected) (United Kingdom) Alice Loveridge (reallocated)
ITTF Specific Tournament (1)	23–24 March 2010	(Italy) Lignano	(Hungary) Tamas Lakatos	(France) Celine Pang
Oceanian Qualification Tournament (1)	1 April 2010	(New Zealand) Auckland	(New Zealand) Kevin Wu	(New Zealand) Julia Wu
Asian Qualification Tournament (4)	2–4 April 2010	(Thailand) Bangkok	(North Korea) Kim Kwang-song (Sri Lanka) Hasintha Arsa Marakkala (India) Avik Das (Uzbekistan) Elmurod Holikov	(North Korea) Kim Song-i (Hong Kong) Ng Ka Yee (Chinese Taipei) Huang Hsin (India) Mallika Bhandarkar
ITTF Specific Qualification Tournament (1)	10 April 2010	(New Zealand) Auckland	(Thailand) Tanapol Santiwattanatarm	(Australia) Lily Phan
European Qualification Tournament (4)	16–18 April 2010	(Italy) Novara	(Poland) Konrad Kulpa (Croatia) Luka Fucek (Austria) Stefan Leitgeb (Netherlands) Koen Hageraats	(Croatia) Mateja Jeger (Moldova) Olga Bliznet (Slovenia) Alekseja Galič (Hungary) Mercedes Nagyvaradi
ITTF Specific Qualification Tournament (1)	24–25 April 2010	(Venezuela) Valencia	(Germany) Florian Wagner	(Belarus) Katsiaryna Baravok
Host Country Representation (1)	-	-	(Singapore) Clarence Chew	Qualified in previous tournament
Unused Quota of Host Country Representation (replacement)	-	-	Quota used	(Portugal) Maria Xiao
NOC Universality Places (4)	-	-	(El Salvador) Luis Mejía (Malawi) Patrick Massah (Mauritius) Warren Li Kam Wa (Paraguay) Axel Gavilan	(Republic of the Congo) Jolie Mafuta Ivoso (San Marino) Letizia Giardi (Sri Lanka) Nuwani G. Vithange (Guyana) Adielle Roshuevel
TOTAL			32	32

=== Mixed team ===
Qualified athletes from the same NOC teamed up first (17 teams). The remaining players formed continental mixed teams as a second option (2 African teams, 6 European teams, 3 Pan American teams), and an intercontinental team was the last consideration (4 teams).

Seed	Team	Female athlete	Male athlete
1	Japan	Ayuka Tanioka (JPN)	Koki Niwa (JPN)
2	South Korea	Yang Ha-Eun (KOR)	Kim Dong-Hyun (KOR)
3	Europe 1	Bernadette Szocs (ROU)	Hampus Soderlund (SWE)
4	Intercontinental 1	Gu Yuting (CHN)	Adem Hmam (TUN)
5	Germany	Petrissa Solja (GER)	Florian Wagner (GER)
6	Hong Kong	Ng Ka Yee (HKG)	Chiu Chung Hei (HKG)
7	Chinese Taipei	Huang Hsin (TPE)	Hung Tzu-Hsiang (TPE)
8	France	Celine Pang (FRA)	Simon Gauzy (FRA)
9	Singapore	Isabelle Siyun LI (SIN)	Clarence Chew (SIN)
10	Croatia	Mateja Jeger (CRO)	Luka Fucek (CRO)
11	Europe 2	Maria Xiao (POR)	Emilien Vanrossomme (BEL)
12	Thailand	Suthasini Sawettabut (THA)	Tanapol Santiwattanatarm (THA)
13	Egypt	Dina Mesheref (EGY)	Bedair Omar (EGY)
14	Netherlands	Britt Eerland (NED)	Koen Hageraats (NED)
15	Hungary	Mercedes Nagyvaradi (HUN)	Tamas Lakatos (HUN)
16	Pan America 1	Ariel Hsing (USA)	Axel Gavilan (PAR)
17	Europe 3	Alice Loveridge (GBR)	Leornado Mutti (ITA)
18	Brazil	Caroline Kumahara (BRA)	Jouti Eric (BRA)
19	Europe 4	Olga Bliznet (MDA)	Konrad Kulpa (POL)
20	Europe 5	Katsiaryna Baravok (BLR)	Ondrej Bajger (CZE)
21	North Korea	Kim Song-I (PRK)	Kim Kwang-song (PRK)
22	Intercontinental 2	Yana Noskova (RUS)	Elmurod Holikov (UZB)
23	Pan America 2	Carelyn Cordero (PUR)	Pablo Saragovi (ARG)
24	India	Mallika Bhandarkar (IND)	Avik Das (IND)
25	Europe 6	Alekseja Galič (SLO)	Stefan Leitgeb (AUT)
26	Africa 1	Islem Laid (ALG)	Ojo Onalaopo (NGR)
27	Intercontinental 3	Lily Phan (AUS)	Luis Mejía (ESA)
28	Sri Lanka	Nuwani G. Vithange (SRI)	Hasintha Arsa Marakkala (SRI)
29	New Zealand	Julia Wu (NZL)	Kevin Wu (NZL)
30	Pan America 3	Adielle Roshuevel (GUY)	Rodrigo Tapia (ECU)
31	Intercontinental 4	Letizia Giardi (SMR)	Patrick Massah (MAW)
32	Africa 2	Jolie Mafuta Ivoso (CGO)	Warren Li Kam Wa (MRI)

== Medal summary ==
=== Medal table ===
Rank	Nation	Gold	Silver	Bronze	Total
1	Japan	2	0	0	2
2	China	1	0	0	1
3	South Korea	0	1	1	2
4	Chinese Taipei	0	1	0	1
4	Singapore	0	1	0	1
6	France	0	0	1	1
–	Mixed-NOCs	0	0	1	1
Totals (6 entries)		3	3	3	9

=== Events ===
Event	Gold	Silver	Bronze
Men's singles	Koki Niwa; Japan	Hung Tzu-Hsiang; Chinese Taipei	Simon Gauzy; France
Women's singles	Gu Yuting; China	Isabelle Li Siyun; Singapore	Yang Ha-Eun; South Korea
Mixed team	Japan; Ayuka Tanioka; Koki Niwa	South Korea; Yang Ha-Eun; Kim Dong-Hyun	Intercontinental 1 Gu Yuting (CHN); Adem Hmam (TUN)
