= Table tennis at the 2010 Summer Youth Olympics – Mixed team =

The mixed team table tennis event was a part of the table tennis program at the 2010 Summer Youth Olympics and took place at the Singapore Indoor Stadium. The tournament started on August 24 with the final on August 26.

32 teams took part in the mixed team event. Teams contained a boy and a girl and were created in an attempt to link athletes by geographic origin, 17 teams contained athletes from the same country, 11 teams contained athletes from the same continent and 4 intercontinental teams were created.

Teams were placed into eight groups where they would play a round robin. In each match the girls of each team will play against each other followed by the boys of each team and ending with a doubles match. The top two from each group proceeded to the next round where a single elimination tournament with a bronze medal final was played. Two consolation rounds were played for teams not advancing to the single elimination tournament.

== Medalists ==
Gold	Silver	Bronze
Japan; Ayuka Tanioka; Koki Niwa	South Korea; Ha Eun Yang; Dong Hyun Kim	Intercontinental 1 Yuting Gu (CHN); Adem Hmam (TUN)

== Teams ==
Seed	Team	Female Athlete	Male Athlete
1	Japan	Ayuka Tanioka (JPN)	Koki Niwa (JPN)
2	South Korea	Yang Ha-Eun (KOR)	Kim Dong-Hyun (KOR)
3	Europe 1	Bernadette Szocs (ROU)	Hampus Soderlund (SWE)
4	Intercontinental 1	Gu Yuting (CHN)	Adem Hmam (TUN)
5	Germany	Petrissa Solja (GER)	Florian Wagner (GER)
6	Hong Kong	Ng Ka Yee (HKG)	Chiu Chung Hei (HKG)
7	Chinese Taipei	Huang Hsin (TPE)	Hung Tzu-Hsiang (TPE)
8	France	Celine Pang (FRA)	Simon Gauzy (FRA)
9	Singapore	Isabelle Siyun LI (SIN)	Clarence Chew (SIN)
10	Croatia	Mateja Jeger (CRO)	Luka Fucek (CRO)
11	Europe 2	Maria Xiao (POR)	Emilen Vanrossomme (BEL)
12	Thailand	Sutashini Sawetabut (THA)	Tanapol Santiwattanatarm (THA)
13	Egypt	Dina Mesheref (EGY)	Bedair Omar (EGY)
14	Netherlands	Britt Eerland (NED)	Koen Hageraats (NED)
15	Hungary	Mercedes Nagyvaradi (HUN)	Tamas Lakatos (HUN)
16	Pan America 1	Ariel Hsing (USA)	Axel Gavilan (PAR)
17	Europe 3	Alice Loveridge (GBR)	Leornado Mutti (ITA)
18	Brazil	Caroline Kumahara (BRA)	Jouti Eric (BRA)
19	Europe 4	Olga Bliznet (MDA)	Konrad Kulpa (POL)
20	Europe 5	Katsiaryna Baravok (BLR)	Ondrej Bajger (CZE)
21	North Korea	Kim Song-I (PRK)	Kim Kwang-song (PRK)
22	Intercontinental 2	Yana Noskova (RUS)	Elmurod Holikov (UZB)
23	Pan America 2	Carelyn Cordero (PUR)	Pablo Saragovi (ARG)
24	India	Mallika Bhandarkar (IND)	Avik Das (IND)
25	Europe 6	Alekseja Galič (SLO)	Stefan Leitgeb (AUT)
26	Africa 1	Islem Laid (ALG)	Ojo Onalaopo (NGR)
27	Intercontinental 3	Lily Phan (AUS)	Luis Mejía (ESA)
28	Sri Lanka	Nuwani G. Vithange (SRI)	Hasintha Arsa Marakkala (SRI)
29	New Zealand	Julia Wu (NZL)	Kevin Wu (NZL)
30	Pan America 3	Adielle Roshuevel (GUY)	Rodrigo Tapia (ECU)
31	Intercontinental 4	Letizia Giardi (SMR)	Patrick Massah (MAW)
32	Africa 2	Jolie Mafuta Ivoso (CGO)	Warren Li Kam Wa (MRI)

== Group stage ==
=== Round 1 ===
==== Group A ====
Team	Pld	W	L	MW	ML
Japan; Ayuka Tanioka (JPN); Koki Niwa (JPN)	2	2	0	6	0
Brazil; Caroline Kumahara (BRA); Eric Jouti (BRA)	2	1	1	2	4
Pan America 1 Ariel Hsing (USA); Axel Gavilan (PAR)	2	0	2	1	5
Germany; Petrissa Solja (GER); Florian Wagner (GER)	Withdrew				

24 August
10:00
Ayuka Tanioka (JPN); Koki Niwa (JPN)	3-0 (3–0, 3–0, 3-0)	Caroline Kumahara (BRA); Eric Jouti (BRA)	Table 1
15:00
Ayuka Tanioka (JPN); Koki Niwa (JPN)	3-0 (3–2, 3–0, 3-0)	Ariel Hsing (USA); Axel Gavilan (PAR)	Table 3
18:00
Ariel Hsing (USA); Axel Gavilan (PAR)	1-2 (1-3, 3–1, 2-3)	Caroline Kumahara (BRA); Eric Jouti (BRA)	Table 1

==== Group B ====
Team	Pld	W	L	MW	ML
Korea; Ha Eun Yang (KOR); Dong Hyun Kim (KOR)	3	3	0	9	0
Hungary; Mercedes Nagyvaradi (HUN); Tamas Lakatos (HUN)	3	2	1	5	4
Europe 5 Katsiaryna Baravok (BLR); Ondrej Bajger (CZE)	3	1	2	4	5
Intercontinental 4 Letizia Giardi (SMR); Patrick Massah (MAW)	3	0	3	0	9

24 August
11:30
Korea; Ha Eun Yang (KOR); Dong Hyun Kim (KOR)	3-0 (3–1, 3–1, 3-0)	Europe 5 Katsiaryna Baravok (BLR); Ondrej Bajger (CZE)	Table 2
11:30
Hungary; Mercedes Nagyvaradi (HUN); Tamas Lakatos (HUN)	3-0 (3–0, 3–0, 3-0)	Intercontinental 4 Letizia Giardi (SMR); Patrick Massah (MAW)	Table 6
16:30
Korea; Ha Eun Yang (KOR); Dong Hyun Kim (KOR)	3-0 (3–0, 3–2, 3-0)	Hungary; Mercedes Nagyvaradi (HUN); Tamas Lakatos (HUN)	Table 3
16:30
Europe 5 Katsiaryna Baravok (BLR); Ondrej Bajger (CZE)	3-0 (3–1, 3–0, 3-0)	Intercontinental 4 Letizia Giardi (SMR); Patrick Massah (MAW)	Table 5
19:30
Korea; Ha Eun Yang (KOR); Dong Hyun Kim (KOR)	3-0 (3–0, 3–0, 3-0)	Intercontinental 4 Letizia Giardi (SMR); Patrick Massah (MAW)	Table 5
19:30
Hungary; Mercedes Nagyvaradi (HUN); Tamas Lakatos (HUN)	2-1 (3–0, 3–0, 1-3)	Europe 5 Katsiaryna Baravok (BLR); Ondrej Bajger (CZE)	Table 3

==== Group C ====
Team	Pld	W	L	MW	ML
Europe 1 Bernadette Szocs (ROU); Hampus Soderlund (SWE)	3	3	0	7	2
Europe 4 Olga Bliznet (MDA); Konrad Kulpa (POL)	3	2	1	6	3
Europe 3 Alice Loveridge (GBR); Leonardo Mutti (ITA)	3	1	2	5	4
Africa 2 Jolie Mafuta Ivoso (CGO); Warren Li Kam Wa (MRI)	3	0	3	0	9

24 August
10:00
Europe 1 Bernadette Szocs (ROU); Hampus Soderlund (SWE)	2-1 (3–0, 1-3, 3-1)	Europe 4 Olga Bliznet (MDA); Konrad Kulpa (POL)	Table 2
10:00
Europe 3 Alice Loveridge (GBR); Leonardo Mutti (ITA)	3-0 (3–0, 3–0, 3-1)	Africa 2 Jolie Mafuta Ivoso (CGO); Warren Li Kam Wa (MRI)	Table 5
15:00
Europe 1 Bernadette Szocs (ROU); Hampus Soderlund (SWE)	2-1 (3–0, 2-3, 3-1)	Europe 3 Alice Loveridge (GBR); Leonardo Mutti (ITA)	Table 8
15:00
Europe 4 Olga Bliznet (MDA); Konrad Kulpa (POL)	3-0 (3–0, 3–0, 3-0)	Africa 2 Jolie Mafuta Ivoso (CGO); Warren Li Kam Wa (MRI)	Table 7
18:00
Europe 1 Bernadette Szocs (ROU); Hampus Soderlund (SWE)	3-0 (3–0, 3–1, 3-0)	Africa 2 Jolie Mafuta Ivoso (CGO); Warren Li Kam Wa (MRI)	Table 6
18:00
Europe 3 Alice Loveridge (GBR); Leonardo Mutti (ITA)	1-2 (0-3, 3–0, 1-3)	Europe 4 Olga Bliznet (MDA); Konrad Kulpa (POL)	Table 3

==== Group D ====
Team	Pld	W	L	MW	ML
Intercontinental 1 Yuting Gu (CHN); Adem Hmam (TUN)	3	3	0	6	3
DPR Korea; Song I Kim (PRK); Kim Kwang-song (PRK)	3	2	1	6	3
Netherlands; Britt Eerland (NED); Koen Hageraats (NED)	3	1	2	5	4
Pan America 3 Adielle Rosheuvel (GUY); Rodrigo Tapia (ECU)	3	0	3	1	8

24 August
11:30
Intercontinental 1 Yuting Gu (CHN); Adem Hmam (TUN)	2-1 (3–1, 0-3, 3-2)	DPR Korea; Song I Kim (PRK); Kim Kwang-song (PRK)	Table 3
11:30
Netherlands; Britt Eerland (NED); Koen Hageraats (NED)	3-0 (3–0, 3–1, 3-0)	Pan America 3 Adielle Rosheuvel (GUY); Rodrigo Tapia (ECU)	Table 5
16:30
Intercontinental 1 Yuting Gu (CHN); Adem Hamam (TUN)	2-1 (3–0, 1-3, 3-1)	Netherlands; Britt Eerland (NED); Koen Hageraats (NED)	Table 6
16:30
DPR Korea; Song I Kim (PRK); Kim Kwang-song (PRK)	3-0 (3–0, 3–0, 3-0)	Pan America 3 Adielle Rosheuvel (GUY); Rodrigo Tapia (ECU)	Table 4
19:30
Intercontinental 1 Yuting Gu (CHN); Adem Hmam (TUN)	2-1 (3–0, 1-3, 3-0)	Pan America 3 Adielle Rosheuvel (GUY); Rodrigo Tapia (ECU)	Table 6
19:30
Netherlands; Britt Eerland (NED); Koen Hageraats (NED)	1-2 (0-3, 3–1, 1-3)	DPR Korea; Song I Kim (PRK); Kim Kwang-song (PRK)	Table 2

==== Group E ====
Team	Pld	W	L	MW	ML
Thailand; Suthasini Sawettabut (THA); Tanapol Santiwattanatarm (THA)	3	3	0	7	2
Hong Kong; Ka Yee Ng (HKG); Chung Hei Chiu (HKG)	3	2	1	7	2
India; Mallika Bhandarkar (IND); Avik Das (IND)	3	1	2	4	5
Sri Lanka; Nuwani Vithanage (SRI); Hasintha Arsa Marakkala (SRI)	3	0	3	0	9

24 August
10:00
Hong Kong; Ka Yee Ng (HKG); Chung Hei Chiu (HKG)	3-0 (3–0, 3–0, 3-0)	India; Mallika Bhandarkar (IND); Avik Das (IND)	Table 3
10:00
Thailand; Suthasini Sawettabut (THA); Tanapol Satiwattanatarm (THA)	3-0 (3–0, 3–2, 3-0)	Sri Lanka; Nuwani Vithanage (SRI); Hasintha Arsa Marakkala (SRI)	Table 6
15:00
Hong Kong; Ka Yee Ng (HKG); Chung Hei Chiu (HKG)	1-2 (2-3, 3–2, 1-3)	Thailand; Suthasini Sawettabut (THA); Tanapol Santiwattanatarm (THA)	Table 1
15:00
India; Mallika Bhandarkar (IND); Avik Das (IND)	3-0 (3–0, 3–2, 3-2)	Sri Lanka; Nuwani Vithanage (SRI); Hasintha Arsa Marakkala (SRI)	Table 4
18:00
Hong Kong; Ka Yee Ng (HKG); Chung Hei Chiu (HKG)	3-0 (3–1, 3–2, 3-1)	Sri Lanka; Nuwani Vithanage (SRI); Hasintha Arsa Marakkala (SRI)	Table 5
18:00
Thailand; Suthasini Sawettabut (THA); Tanapol Santiwattanatarm (THA)	2-1 (3–0, 2-3, 3-1)	India; Mallika Bhandarkar (IND); Avik Das (IND)	Table 2

==== Group F ====
Team	Pld	W	L	MW	ML
Chinese Taipei; Hsin Huang (TPE); Tzu-Hsiang Hung (TPE)	3	3	0	9	0
Croatia; Mateja Jeger (CRO); Luka Fucec (CRO)	3	2	1	6	3
Pan America 2 Carelyn Cordero (PUR); Pablo Saragovi (ARG)	3	1	2	3	6
New Zealand; Julia Wu (NZL); Kevin Wu (NZL)	3	0	3	0	9

24 August
11:30
Chinese Taipei; Hsin Huang (TPE); Tzu-Hsiang Hung (TPE)	3-0 (3–0, 3–0, 3-0)	Pan America 2 Carelyn Cordero (PUR); Pablo Saragovi (ARG)	Table 4
11:30
Croatia; Mateja Jeger (CRO); Luka Fucec (CRO)	3-0 (3–0, 3–1, 3-1)	New Zealand; Julia Wu (NZL); Kevin Wu (NZL)	Table 7
16:30
Chinese Taipei; Hsin Huang (TPE); Tzu-Hsiang Hung (TPE)	3-0 (3–1, 3–1, 3-0)	Croatia; Mateja Jeger (CRO); Luka Fucec (CRO)	Table 2
16:30
Pan America 2 Carelyn Cordero (PUR); Pablo Saragovi (ARG)	3-0 (3–0, 3–1, 3-1)	New Zealand; Julia Wu (NZL); Kevin Wu (NZL)	Table 7
19:30
Chinese Taipei; Hsin Huang (TPE); Tzu-Hsiang Hung (TPE)	3-0 (3–0, 3–0, 3-0)	New Zealand; Julia Wu (NZL); Kevin Wu (NZL)	Table 7
19:30
Croatia; Mateja Jeger (CRO); Luka Fucec (CRO)	3-0 (3–0, 3–1, 3-0)	Pan America 2 Carelyn Cordero (PUR); Pablo Saragovi (ARG)	Table 1

==== Group G ====
Team	Pld	W	L	MW	ML
France; Celine Pang (FRA); Simon Gauzy (FRA)	3	3	0	7	2
Europe 2 Maria Xiao (POR); Emilien Vanrossomme (BEL)	3	2	1	7	2
Europe 6 Alex Galic (SLO); Stefan Leitgeb (AUT)	3	1	2	4	5
Intercontinental 3 Lily Phan (AUS); Luis Mejía (ESA)	3	0	3	0	9

24 August
10:00
France; Celine Pang (FRA); Simon Gauzy (FRA)	2-1 (3–0, 3–0, 2-3)	Europe 6 Alex Galic (SLO); Stefan Leitgeb (AUT)	Table 4
10:00
Europe 2 Maria Xiao (POR); Emilien Vanrossomme (BEL)	3-0 (3–0, 3–0, 3-0)	Intercontinental 3 Lily Phan (AUS); Luis Mejía (ESA)	Table 7
15:00
France; Celine Pang (FRA); Simon Gauzy (FRA)	2-1 (0-3, 3–1, 3-1)	Europe 2 Maria Xiao (POR); Emilien Vanrossomme (BEL)	Table 2
15:00
Europe 6 Alex Galic (SLO); Stefan Leitgeb (AUT)	3-0 (3–0, 3–1, 3-0)	Intercontinental 3 Lily Phan (AUS); Luis Mejía (ESA)	Table 5
18:00
France; Celine Pang (FRA); Simon Gauzy (FRA)	3-0 (3–0, 3–0, 3-0)	Intercontinental 3 Lily Phan (AUS); Luis Mejía (ESA)	Table 4
18:00
Europe 2 Maria Xiao (POR); Emilien Vanrossomme (BEL)	3-0 (3–0, 3–1, 3-2)	Europe 6 Alex Galic (SLO); Stefan Leitgeb (AUT)	Table 7

==== Group H ====
Team	Pld	W	L	MW	ML
Singapore; Isabelle Siyun Li (SIN); Zhe Yu Clarence Chew (SIN)	3	3	0	7	2
Egypt; Dina Meshref (EGY); Omar Bedair (EGY)	3	2	1	5	4
Intercontinental 2 Yana Noskova (RUS); Elmurod Holikov (UZB)	3	1	2	3	6
Africa 1 Islem Laid (ALG); Ojo Onaolapo (NGR)	3	0	3	3	6

24 August
11:30
Singapore; Isabelle Siyun Li (SIN); Zhe Yu Clarence Chew (SIN)	2-1 (2-3, 3–0, 3-1)	Intercontinental 2 Yana Noskova (RUS); Elmurod Holikov (UZB)	Table 1
11:30
Egypt; Dina Meshref (EGY); Omar Bedair (EGY)	2-1 (3–0, 3–2, 0-3)	Africa 1 Islem Laid (ALG); Ojo Onaolapo (NGR)	Table 8
16:30
Singapore; Isabelle Siyun Li (SIN); Zhe Yu Clarence Chew (SIN)	3-0 (3–0, 3–1, 3-1)	Egypt; Dina Meshref (EGY); Omar Bedair (EGY)	Table 1
16:30
Intercontinental 2 Yana Noskova (RUS); Elmurod Holikov (UZB)	2-1 (3–0, 0-3, 3-0)	Africa 1 Islem Laid (ALG); Ojo Onaolapo (NGR)	Table 8
19:30
Singapore; Isabelle Siyun Li (SIN); Zhe Yu Clarence Chew (SIN)	2-1 (3–0, 1-3, 3-0)	Africa 1 Islem Laid (ALG); Ojo Onalapo (NGR)	Table 1
19:30
Egypt; Dina Meshref (EGY); Omar Bedair (EGY)	3-0 (3–2, 3–0, 3-1)	Intercontinental 2 Yana Noskova (RUS); Elmurod Holikov (UZB)	Table 8

== Consolation Rounds ==
=== Consolation Round 1 ===
25 August
10:00
Netherlands; Britt Eerland (NED); Koen Hageraats (NED)	0-2 (w/o)	Intercontinental 4 Letizia Giardi (SMR); Patrick Massah (MAW)	Table 3
10:00
New Zealand; Julia Wu (NZL); Kevin Wu (NZL)	1-2 (0-3, 3–2, 1-3)	India; Mallika Bhandarkar (IND); Avik Das (IND)	Table 2
10:00
Pan American 2 Carelyn Cordero (PUR); Pablo Saragovi (ARG)	2-0 (w/o)	Germany; Petrissa Solja (GER); Florian Wagner (GER)	Table 8
10:00
Intercontinental 3 Lily Phan (AUS); Luis Mejía (ESA)	0-2 (2-3, 0-3)	Europe 3 Alice Loveridge (GBR); Leonardo Mutti (ITA)	Table 4
10:00
Pan America 1 Ariel Hsing (USA); Axel Gavilan (PAR)	2-0 (w/o)	Africa 1 Islem Laid (ALG); Ojo Onaolapo (NGR)	Table 7
10:00
Pan America 3 Adielle Rosheuvel (GUY); Rodrigo Tapia (ECU)	0-2 (0-3, 0-3)	Europe 6 Alex Galic (SLO); Stefan Leitgeb (AUT)	Table 5
10:00
Intercontinental 2 Yana Noskova (RUS); Elmurod Holikov (UZB)	2-0 (3–0, 3–0)	Africa 2 Jolie Mafuta Ivoso (CGO); Warren Li Kam Wa (MRI)	Table 6
10:00
Sri Lanka; Nuwani Vithanage (SRI); Hasintha Arsa Marakkala (SRI)	0-2 (2-3, 2-3)	Europe 5 Katsiaryna Baravok (BLR); Ondrej Bajger (CZE)	Table 1

=== Consolation Round 2 ===
25 August
16:30
Intercontinental 4 Letizia Giardi (SMR); Patrick Massah (MAW)	0-2 (0-3, 0-3)	India; Mallika Bhandarkar (IND); Avik Das (IND)	Table 4
16:30
Pan America 2 Carelyn Cordero (PUR); Pablo Saragovi (ARG)	1-2 (3–2, 2-3, 1-3)	Europe 3 Alice Loveridge (GBR); Leonardo Mutti (ITA)	Table 1
16:30
Pan America 1 Ariel Hsing (USA); Axel Gavilan (PAR)	0-2 (1-3, 2-3)	Europe 6 Alex Galic (SLO); Stefan Leitgeb (AUT)	Table 2
16:30
Intercontinental 2 Yana Noskova (RUS); Elmurod Holikov (UZB)	0-2 (w/o)	Europe 5 Katsiaryna Baravok (BLR); Ondrej Bajger (CZE)	Table 3

== Knockout stage ==
Round of 16
1	Japan; Ayuka Tanioka (JPN); Koki Niwa (JPN)	3	3
6	Hong Kong; Ka Yee Ng (HKG); Chung Hei Chiu (HKG)	2	2
19	Europe 4 Olga Bliznet (MDA); Konrad Kulpa (POL)	0	1
9	Singapore; Isabelle Siyun Li (SIN); Zhe Yu Clarence Chew (SIN)	3	3
7	Chinese Taipei; Hsin Huang (TPE); Tzu-Hsiang Hung (TPE)	3	3
15	Hungary; Mercedes Nagyvaradi (HUN); Tamas Lakatos (HUN)	2	1
11	Europe 2 Maria Xiao (POR); Emilien Vanrossomme (BEL)	0	3	2
4	Intercontinental 1 Yuting Gu (CHN); Adem Hmam (TUN)	3	2	3
3	Europe 1 Bernadette Szocs (ROU); Hampus Soderlund (SWE)	3	3
18	Brazil; Caroline Kumahara (BRA); Eric Jouti (BRA)	1	1
21	DPR Korea; Song I Kim (PRK); Kim Kwang-song (PRK)	3	3
8	France; Celine Pang (FRA); Simon Gauzy (FRA)	0	0
12	Thailand; Suthasini Sawettabut (THA); Tanapol Santiwattanatarm (THA)	3	3
10	Croatia; Mateja Jeger (CRO); Luka Fucec (CRO)	0	2
13	Egypt; Dina Meshref (EGY); Omar Bedair (EGY)	1	2
2	Korea; Ha Eun Yang (KOR); Dong Hyun Kim (KOR)	3	3

Quarterfinals
1	Japan; Ayuka Tanioka (JPN); Koki Niwa (JPN)	0	3	3
9	Singapore; Isabelle Siyun Li (SIN); Zhe Yu Clarence Chew (SIN)	3	1	2
7	Chinese Taipei; Hsin Huang (TPE); Tzu-Hsiang Hung (TPE)	0	3	1
4	Intercontinental 1 Yuting Gu (CHN); Adem Hmam (TUN)	3	0	3
3	Europe 1 Bernadette Szocs (ROU); Hampus Soderlund (SWE)	2	3	2
21	DPR Korea; Song I Kim (PRK); Kim Kwang-song (PRK)	3	0	3
12	Thailand; Suthasini Sawettabut (THA); Tanapol Santiwattanatarm (THA)	0	1
2	Korea; Ha Eun Yang (KOR); Dong Hyun Kim (KOR)	3	3

Semifinals
1	Japan; Ayuka Tanioka (JPN); Koki Niwa (JPN)	0	3	3
4	Intercontinental 1 Yuting Gu (CHN); Adem Hmam (TUN)	3	0	1
21	DPR Korea; Song I Kim (PRK); Kim Kwang-song (PRK)	1	1
2	Korea; Ha Eun Yang (KOR); Dong Hyun Kim (KOR)	3	3

Final
1	Japan; Ayuka Tanioka (JPN); Koki Niwa (JPN)	2	3	3
2	Korea; Ha Eun Yang (KOR); Dong Hyun Kim (KOR)	3	2	2
Bronze Medal Match
4	Intercontinental 1 Yuting Gu (CHN); Adem Hmam (TUN)	3	2	3
21	DPR Korea; Song I Kim (PRK); Kim Kwang-song (PRK)	0	3	1
