= Table tennis at the 2010 Summer Youth Olympics – Men's singles =

Boys' table tennis event

The boys' singles table tennis event was a part of the table tennis program at the 2010 Summer Youth Olympics and took place at the Singapore Indoor Stadium. The tournament started on August 21 with the final on August 23.

32 athletes took part in the boys' single event. Athletes were split into eight groups where they would play a round robin. The top two from each group would proceed to the next round where they are placed in another group where another round robin is played, while the bottom two from the first round played in a consolation round robin. The top two from that group would proceed to the quarterfinals where there was a single elimination tournament with a bronze medal final.

== Medalists ==
Gold	Silver	Bronze
Koki Niwa; Japan	Tzu-Hsiang Hung; Chinese Taipei	Simon Gauzy; France

== Group stages ==
=== Round 1 ===
==== Group A ====
Athlete	Pld	W	L	MW	ML
Koki Niwa (JPN)	3	3	0	9	0
Konrad Kulpa (POL)	3	2	1	6	3
Luis Mejia (ESA)	3	1	2	3	8
Florian Wagner (GER)	3	0	3	2	9

21 August
11:00
Koki Niwa (JPN)	3–0 (11–6, 11–4, 11–7)	Konrad Kulpa (POL)	Table 2
11:00
Florian Wagner (GER)	2–3 (9–11, 4–11, 11–3, 11–8, 7–11)	Luis Mejia (ESA)	Table 3
13:00
Niwa Koki (JPN)	3–0 (11–7, 11–5, 11–7)	Florian Wagner (GER)	Table 5
13:00
Konrad Kulpa (POL)	3–0 (11–2, 12–10, 11–4)	Luis Mejia (ESA)	Table 3
15:00
Koki Niwa (JPN)	3–0 (11–4, 11–5, 11–4)	Luis Mejia (ESA)	Table 3
15:00
Florian Wagner (GER)	0–3 (5–11,7– 11, RET)	Konrad Kulpa (POL)	Table 5

==== Group B ====
Athlete	Pld	W	L	MW	ML
Tzu-Hsiang Hung (TPE)	3	3	0	9	0
Zhe Yu Clarence Chew (SIN)	3	2	1	6	4
Adem Hmam (TUN)	3	1	2	4	6
Patrick Massah (MAW)	3	0	3	0	9

21 August
11:30
Tzu-Hsiang Hung (TPE)	3–0 (11–8, 11–9, 11–8)	Adem Hmam (TUN)	Table 3
11:30
Zhe Yu Clarence Chew (SIN)	3–0 (11–3, 11–2, 11–5)	Patrick Massah (MAW)	Table 4
13:30
Tzu-Hsiang Hung (TPE)	3–0 (11–6, 11–4, 11–8)	Zhe Yu Clarence Chew (SIN)	Table 3
13:30
Adem Hmam (TUN)	3–0 (11–3, 11–3, 11–5)	Patrick Massah (MAW)	Table 4
15:30
Tzu-Hsiang Hung (TPE)	3–0 (11–6, 11–4, 11–6)	Patrick Massah (MAW)	Table 3
15:30
Zhe Yu Clarence Chew (SIN)	3–1 (11–7, 11–9, 11–13, 11-8)	Adem Hmam (TUN)	Table 1

==== Group C ====
Athlete	Pld	W	L	MW	ML
Simon Gauzy (FRA)	3	3	0	9	1
Koen Hageraats (NED)	3	2	1	7	7
Eric Jouti (BRA)	3	1	2	5	6
Elmurod Holikov (UZB)	3	0	3	2	9

21 August
11:00
Simon Gauzy (FRA)	3–0 (15–13, 11–2, 11–4)	Eric Jouti (BRA)	Table 5
11:00
Koen Hageraats (NED)	3–2 (12–10, 11–8, 7–11, 9–11, 11–4)	Elmurod Holikov (UZB)	Table 4
13:00
Simon Gauzy (FRA)	3–1 (11–9, 14–12, 5–11, 11–7)	Koen Hageraats (NED)	Table 6
13:00
Eric Jouti (BRA)	3–0 (11–9, 11–6, 11–1)	Elmurod Holikov (UZB)	Table 1
15:00
Simon Gauzy (FRA)	3–0 (11–4, 11–1, 11–5)	Elmurod Holikov (UZB)	Table 1
15:00
Koen Hageraats (NED)	3–2 (11–7, 9–11, 11–9, 9–11, 11–5)	Eric Jouti (BRA)	Table 4

==== Group D ====
Athlete	Pld	W	L	MW	ML
Hampus Soderlund (SWE)	3	3	0	9	2
Luka Fucec (CRO)	3	2	1	6	5
Axel Gavilan (PAR)	3	1	2	7	8
Warren Li Kam Wa (MRI)	3	0	3	2	9

21 August
11:30
Hampus Soderlund (SWE)	3–2 (14–12, 9–11, 11–2, 9–11, 11–6)	Axel Gavilan (PAR)	Table 2
11:30
Luka Fucec (CRO)	3–0 (11–6, 11–7, 12–10)	Warren Li Kam Wa (MRI)	Table 7
13:30
Hampus Soderlund (SWE)	3–0 (13–11, 11–7, 11–6)	Luka Fucec (CRO)	Table 1
13:30
Axel Gavilan (PAR)	3–2 (11–9, 15–13, 11–13, 9–11 11–4)	Warren Li Kam Wa (MRI)	Table 5
15:30
Hampus Soderlund (SWE)	3–0 (11–6, 11–9, 11–5)	Warren Li Kam Wa (MRI)	Table 6
15:30
Luka Fucec (CRO)	3–2 (12–14, 11–3, 11–9, 9–11 12–10)	Axel Gavilan (PAR)	Table 5

==== Group E ====
Athlete	Pld	W	L	MW	ML
Chung Hei Chiu (HKG)	3	3	0	9	1
Ondrej Bajger (CZE)	3	2	1	6	5
Tanapol Santiwattanatarm (THA)	3	1	2	4	8
Hasintha Arsa Marakkala (SRI)	3	0	3	4	9

21 August
11:00
Chung Hei Chiu (HKG)	3–1 (11–7, 16–14, 10–12, 14–12)	Tanapol Santiwattanatarm (THA)	Table 7
11:00
Ondrej Bajger (CZE)	3–2 (15–13, 11–8, 9–11, 8–11, 11–9)	Hasintha Arsa Marakkala (SRI)	Table 6
13:00
Chung Hei Chiu (HKG)	3–0 (12–10, 11–5, 11–9)	Ondrej Bajger (CZE)	Table 7
13:00
Tanapol Santiwattanatarm (THA)	3–2 (11–7, 12–14, 10–12, 11–9, 11–5)	Hasintha Arsa Marakkala (SRI)	Table 2
15:00
Chung Hei Chiu (HKG)	3–0 (11–7, 11–4, 11–9)	Hasintha Arsa Marakkala (SRI)	Table 6
15:00
Ondrej Bajger (CZE)	3–0 (11–4, 11–9, 11–6)	Tanapol Santiwattanatarm (THA)	Table 8

==== Group F ====
Athlete	Pld	W	L	MW	ML
Ojo Onaolapo (NGR)	3	3	0	9	2
Dong Hyun Kim (KOR)	3	2	1	6	3
Kevin Wu (NZL)	3	1	2	4	7
Pablo Saragovi (ARG)	3	0	3	2	9

21 August
11:30
Dong Hyun Kim (KOR)	3–0 (11–3, 11–8, 11–6)	Pablo Saragovi (ARG)	Table 5
11:30
Ojo Onaolapo (NGR)	3–1 (11–5, 7–11, 11–8, 11–3)	Kevin Wu (NZL)	Table 1
13:30
Dong Hyun Kim (KOR)	0–3 (9–11, 6–11, 12–14)	Ojo Onaolapo (NGR)	Table 6
13:30
Pablo Saragovi (ARG)	1–3 (11–9, 10–12, 15–17, 6–11)	Kevin Wu (NZL)	Table 7
15:30
Dong Hyun Kim (KOR)	3–0 (11–7, 11–2, 11–4)	Kevin Wu (NZL)	Table 7
15:30
Ojo Onaolapo (NGR)	3–1 (5–11, 11–7, 11–4, 11–2)	Pablo Saragovi (ARG)	Table 4

==== Group G ====
Athlete	Pld	W	L	MW	ML
Emilien Vanrossomme (BEL)	3	3	0	9	2
Stefan Leitgeb (AUT)	3	2	1	7	4
Leonardo Mutti (ITA)	3	1	2	5	7
Avik Das (IND)	3	0	3	1	9

21 August
11:00
Leonardo Mutti (ITA)	1–3 (8–11, 5–11, 13–11, 8–11)	Stefan Leitgeb (AUT)	Table 8
11:00
Emilien Vanrossomme (BEL)	3–0 (11–3, 12–10, 11–5)	Avik Das (IND)	Table 1
13:00
Leonardo Mutti (ITA)	1–3 (11–6, 4–11, 8–11, 10–12)	Emilien Vanrossomme (BEL)	Table 4
13:00
Stefan Leitgeb (AUT)	3–0 (11–6, 11–7, 11–9)	Avik Das (IND)	Table 8
15:00
Leonardo Mutti (ITA)	3–1 (9–11, 15–13, 11–6, 11–7)	Avik Das (IND)	Table 2
15:00
Emilien Vanrossomme (BEL)	3–1 (11–9, 6–11, 11–3, 11–2)	Stefan Leitgeb (AUT)	Table 7

==== Group H ====
Athlete	Pld	W	L	MW	ML
Tamas Lakatos (HUN)	3	3	0	9	2
Kim Kwang-song (PRK)	3	2	1	8	5
Omar Bedair (EGY)	3	1	2	5	6
Rodrigo Tapia (ECU)	3	0	3	0	9

21 August
11:30
Tamas Lakatos (HUN)	3–2 (11–8, 7–11, 11–13, 11–6, 12–10)	Kim Kwang-song (PRK)	Table 6
11:30
Omar Bedair (EGY)	3–0 (11–8, 11–5, 11–9)	Rodrigo Tapia (ECU)	Table 8
13:30
Tamas Lakatos (HUN)	3–0 (11–6, 11–7, 12–10)	Omar Bedair (EGY)	Table 8
13:30
Kim Kwang-song (PRK)	3–0 (11–9, 13–11, 11–7)	Rodrigo Tapia (ECU)	Table 2
15:30
Tamas Lakatos (HUN)	3–0 (11–7, 11–8, 11–8)	Rodrigo Tapia (ECU)	Table 8
15:30
Omar Bedair (EGY)	2–3 (11–3, 12–10, 6–11, 8–11, 5–11)	Kim Kwang-song (PRK)	Table 2

=== Round 2 ===
==== Group AA ====
Athlete	Pld	W	L	MW	ML
Koki Niwa (JPN)	3	3	0	9	1
Tamas Lakatos (HUN)	3	2	1	6	6
Dong Hyun Kim (KOR)	3	1	2	6	6
Koen Hageraats (NED)	3	0	3	1	9

21 August
19:00
Koki Niwa (JPN)	3–0 (11–3, 11–6, 11–2)	Koen Hageraats (NED)	Table 3
19:00
Tamas Lakatos (HUN)	3–2 (11–8, 3–11, 11–5, 8–11, 11–8)	Dong Hyun Kim (KOR)	Table 2
22 August
11:00
Koki Niwa (JPN)	3–0 (11–5, 11–7, 11–2)	Tamas Lakatos (HUN)	Table 1
11:00
Koen Hageraats (NED)	0–3 (5–11, 7–11, 13–15)	Dong Hyun Kim (KOR)	Table 5
13:00
Koki Niwa (JPN)	3–1 (11–7, 11–4, 7–11, 11–3)	Dong Hyun Kim (KOR)	Table 5
13:00
Tamas Lakatos (HUN)	3–1 (11–7, 7–11, 11–5, 11–3)	Koen Hageraats (NED)	Table 3

==== Group BB ====
Athlete	Pld	W	L	MW	ML
Tzu-Hsiang Hung (TPE)	3	3	0	9	2
Emilien Vanrossomme (BEL)	3	2	1	7	6
Ondrej Bajger (CZE)	3	1	2	6	6
Kim Kwang-song (PRK)	3	0	3	1	9

21 August
19:00
Tzu-Hsiang Hung (TPE)	3–1 (11–6, 11–6, 8–11, 11–5)	Ondrej Bajger (CZE)	Table 4
19:00
Emilien Vanrossomme (BEL)	3–1 (12–14, 11–6, 11–1, 11–8)	Kim Kwang-song (PRK)	Table 5
22 August
11:00
Tzu-Hsiang Hung (TPE)	3–1 (11–5, 11–4, 10–12, 11–3)	Emilien Vanrossomme (BEL)	Table 6
11:00
Ondrej Bajger (CZE)	3–0 (11–8, 11–8, 11–9)	Kim Kwang-song (PRK)	Table 7
13:00
Tzu-Hsiang Hung (TPE)	3–0 (11–7, 11–9, 11–9)	Kim Kwang-song (PRK)	Table 2
13:00
Emilien Vanrossomme (BEL)	3–2 (11–2, 9–11, 11–4, 9–11, 11–9)	Ondrej Bajger (CZE)	Table 4

==== Group CC ====
Athlete	Pld	W	L	MW	ML
Simon Gauzy (FRA)	3	3	0	9	3
Chung Hei Chiu (HKG)	3	2	1	7	7
Luka Fucec (CRO)	3	1	2	7	8
Konrad Kulpa (POL)	3	0	3	4	9

21 August
19:00
Simon Gauzy (FRA)	3–0 (14–12, 11–8, 13–11)	Konrad Kulpa (POL)	Table 6
19:00
Chung Hei Chiu (HKG)	3–2 (10–12, 11–5, 11–9, 9–11, 11-7)	Luka Fucec (CRO)	Table 7
22 August
11:00
Simon Gauzy (FRA)	3–1 (8–11, 11–4, 11–6, 11–5)	Chung Hei Chiu (HKG)	Table 2
11:00
Konrad Kulpa (POL)	2–3 (11–6, 11–2, 9–11, 8–11, 11–13)	Luka Fucec (CRO)	Table 8
13:00
Simon Gauzy (FRA)	3–2 (11–8, 8–11, 6–11, 11–7, 11–3)	Luka Fucec (CRO)	Table 6
13:00
Chung Hei Chiu (HKG)	3–2 (10–12, 11–4, 4–11, 11–2, 11–7)	Konrad Kulpa (POL)	Table 7

==== Group DD ====
Athlete	Pld	W	L	MW	ML
Hampus Soderlund (SWE)	3	2	1	7	3
Ojo Onaolapo (NGR)	3	2	1	6	5
Stefan Leitgeb (AUT)	3	1	2	3	8
Zhe Yu Clarence Chew (SIN)	3	1	2	7	7

21 August
19:00
Hampus Soderlund (SWE)	1–3 (11–9, 6–11, 9–11, 8–11)	Zhe Yu Clarence Chew (SIN)	Table 1
19:00
Ojo Onaolapo (NGR)	3–0 (11–7, 11–9, 11–3)	Stefan Leitgeb (AUT)	Table 8
22 August
11:00
Hampus Soderlund (SWE)	3–0 (11–6, 11–7, 11–4)	Ojo Onaolapo (NGR)	Table 4
11:00
Zhe Yu Clarence Chew (SIN)	2–3 (11–9, 8–11, 8–11, 11–5, 3–11)	Stefan Leitgeb (AUT)	Table 3
13:00
Hampus Soderlund (SWE)	3–0 (11–7, 11–7, 11–7)	Stefan Leitgeb (AUT)	Table 8
13:00
Ojo Onaolapo (NGR)	3–2 (11–9, 8–11, 11–4, 6–11, 11–7)	Zhe Yu Clarence Chew (SIN)	Table 1

=== Consolation Round ===
Bottom two athletes from each group in round 1 compete here.

==== Group EE ====
Athlete	Pld	W	L	MW	ML
Axel Gavilan (PAR)	3	3	0	9	2
Elmurod Holikov (UZB)	3	2	1	6	5
Luis Mejia (ESA)	3	1	2	3	7
Avik Das (IND)	3	0	3	5	9

21 August
19:30
Luis Mejia (ESA)	0–3 (5–11, 8–11, 7–11)	Elmurod Holikov (UZB)	Table 4
19:30
Axel Gavilan (PAR)	3–2 (11–7, 13–15, 11–5, 7–11, 11–8)	Avik Das (IND)	Table 2
22 August
11:30
Luis Mejia (ESA)	0–3 (12–14, 6–11, 9–11)	Axel Gavilan (PAR)	Table 4
11:30
Elmurod Holikov (UZB)	3–2 (11–7, 8–11, 11–2, 14–16, 11–8)	Avik Das (IND)	Table 5
13:30
Luis Mejia (ESA)	3–1 (12–10, 11–6, 6–11, 11–9)	Avik Das (IND)	Table 3
13:30
Axel Gavilan (PAR)	3–0 (11–8, 11–8, 11–9)	Elmurod Holikov (UZB)	Table 4

==== Group FF ====
Athlete	Pld	W	L	MW	ML
Tanapol Santiwattanatarm (THA)	3	3	0	9	0
Florian Wagner (GER)	3	2	1	6	5
Kevin Wu (NZL)	3	1	2	4	8
Warren Li Kam Wa (MRI)	3	0	3	3	9

21 August
19:30
Tanapol Santiwattanatarm (THA)	3–0 (w/o)	Florian Wagner (GER)	Table 5
19:30
Kevin Wu (NZL)	3–2 (6–11, 11–4, 8–11, 11–4, 11–7)	Warren Li Kam Wa (MRI)	Table 6
22 August
11:30
Tanapol Santiwattanatarm (THA)	3–0 (11–8, 11–8, 11–8)	Kevin Wu (NZL)	Table 1
11:30
Florian Wagner (GER)	3–1 (11–8, 9–11, 13–11, 11–7)	Warren Li Kam Wa (MRI)	Table 6
13:30
Tanapol Santiwattanatarm (THA)	3–0 (11–7, 11–2, 12–10)	Warren Li Kam Wa (MRI)	Table 5
13:30
Kevin Wu (NZL)	1–3 (7–11, 4–11, 11–6, 9–11)	Florian Wagner (GER)	Table 2

==== Group GG ====
Athlete	Pld	W	L	MW	ML
Adem Hmam (TUN)	3	2	1	7	7
Eric Jouti (BRA)	3	2	1	8	3
Rodrigo Tapia (ECU)	3	1	2	5	7
Pablo Saragovi (ARG)	3	1	2	4	7

21 August
19:30
Adem Hmam (TUN)	3–2 (3–11, 11–3, 11–8, 13–15, 11–9)	Rodrigo Tapia (ECU)	Table 7
19:30
Eric Jouti (BRA)	3–0 (11–4, 11–7, 11–6)	Pablo Saragovi (ARG)	Table 1
22 August
11:30
Adem Hmam (TUN)	3–2 (11–8, 7–11, 11–9, 4–11, 11–7)	Eric Jouti (BRA)	Table 7
11:30
Rodrigo Tapia (ECU)	3–1 (3–11, 11–8, 11–6, 11–8)	Pablo Saragovi (ARG)	Table 3
13:30
Adem Hmam (TUN)	1–3 (1–11, 11–5, 8–11, 7–11)	Pablo Saragovi (ARG)	Table 6
13:30
Eric Jouti (BRA)	3–0 (11–4, 11–3, 11–8)	Rodrigo Tapia (ECU)	Table 7

==== Group HH ====
Athlete	Pld	W	L	MW	ML
Omar Bedair (EGY)	3	3	0	9	3
Leonardo Mutti (ITA)	3	2	1	7	3
Hasintha Arsa Marakkala (SRI)	3	1	2	5	6
Patrick Massah (MAW)	3	0	3	0	9

21 August
19:30
Leonardo Mutti (ITA)	3–0 (11–7, 11–2, 11–3)	Patrick Massah (MAW)	Table 8
19:30
Omar Bedair (EGY)	3–2 (11–8, 10–12, 8–11, 11–8, 14–12)	Hasintha Arsa Marakkala (SRI)	Table 3
22 August
11:30
Leonardo Mutti (ITA)	1–3 (11–6, 4–11, 6–11, 9–11)	Omar Bedair (EGY)	Table 2
11:30
Patrick Massah (MAW)	0–3 (3–11, 3–11, 5–11)	Hasintha Arsa Marakkala (SRI)	Table 8
13:30
Leonardo Mutti (ITA)	3–0 (13–11, 11–5, 11–6)	Hasintha Arsa Marakkala (SRI)	Table 1
13:30
Omar Bedair (EGY)	3–0 (11–2, 11–2, 11–3)	Patrick Massah (MAW)	Table 8

== Knockout stage ==
Quarterfinals
Koki Niwa (JPN)	8	8	11	11	11	13
Ojo Onaolapo (NGR)	11	11	8	9	9	11
Emilien Vanrossomme (BEL)	6	7	12	8	6
Simon Gauzy (FRA)	11	11	10	11	11
Hampus Soderlund (SWE)	7	3	11	8	11	4
Tamas Lakatos (HUN)	11	11	4	11	1	11
Chung Hei Chiu (HKG)	7	11	12	11	5	3	6
Tzu-Hsiang Hung (TPE)	11	8	10	8	11	11	11

Semifinals
Koki Niwa (JPN)	11	14	11	11
Simon Gauzy (FRA)	7	12	4	8
Tamas Lakatos (HUN)	3	8	3	8
Tzu-Hsiang Hung (TPE)	11	11	11	11

Final
Koki Niwa (JPN)	9	11	13	13	11	15
Tzu-Hsiang Hung (TPE)	11	8	11	15	7	13
Bronze-medal match
Simon Gauzy (FRA)	11	12	9	11	11
Tamas Lakatos (HUN)	2	10	11	9	8
