= Chinese Taipei at the 2010 Summer Youth Olympics =

- IOC code: TPE
- NOC: Chinese Taipei Olympic Committee

in Singapore
- Competitors: 24 in 10 sports
- Flag bearer: Chao-Tsun Cheng
- Medals Ranked 60th: Gold 0 Silver 3 Bronze 0 Total 3

Summer Youth Olympics appearances (overview)
- 2010; 2014; 2018

Chinese Taipei participated in the 2010 Summer Youth Olympics in Singapore.

== Medalists ==
| Medal | Name | Sport | Event | Date |
|---|---|---|---|---|
| Silver | Hsing-Chun Kuo | Weightlifting | Women's 53 kg | 16 Aug |
| Silver | Ya-Ting Tan | Archery | Junior Women's Individual | 20 Aug |
| Silver | Tzu-Hsiang Hung | Table tennis | Men's Singles | 23 Aug |

== Archery ==
Boys

| Athlete | Event | Ranking Round | | Round of 32 | Round of 16 | Quarterfinals | Semifinals | Final | |
| Athlete | Event | Score | Seed | Opposition Score | Opposition Score | Opposition Score | Opposition Score | Opposition Score | Rank |
|---|---|---|---|---|---|---|---|---|---|
| Yuan-Hsiang Ku | Boys’ Individual | 620 | 13 | Hajduk (CZE); L 4-6 | Did not advance | | | | 17 |

Girls

| Athlete | Event | Ranking Round | | Round of 32 | Round of 16 | Quarterfinals | Semifinals | Final | |
| Athlete | Event | Score | Seed | Opposition Score | Opposition Score | Opposition Score | Opposition Score | Opposition Score | Rank |
|---|---|---|---|---|---|---|---|---|---|
| Ya-Ting Tan | Girls’ Individual | 648 | 2 | Kamel (EGY); W 6-0 | Unsal (TUR); W 6-2 | Song (CHN); W 6-0 | Segina (RUS); W 6-2 | Kwak (KOR); L 2-6 | Silver medal |

Mixed Team

| Athlete | Event | Partner | Round of 32 | Round of 16 | Quarterfinals | Semifinals | Final | |
| Athlete | Event | Partner | Opposition Score | Opposition Score | Opposition Score | Opposition Score | Opposition Score | Rank |
|---|---|---|---|---|---|---|---|---|
| Yuan-Hsiang Ku | Mixed Team | Mai Okubo (JPN) | Avitia (MEX)/ Hautamaki (FIN); L 6-0 | Song (CHN)/ Pianesi (ITA); L 0-6 | Did not advance | | | 9 |
| Ya-Ting Tan | Mixed Team | Tanapat Harikul (THA) | Caspersen (DEN)/ Rossignol (FRA); L 4-6 | Did not advance | | | | 17 |

== Athletics ==
=== Boys ===
Track and Road Events

| Athletes | Event | Qualification | | Final | |
| Athletes | Event | Result | Rank | Result | Rank |
|---|---|---|---|---|---|
| Jen-Chieh Chen | Boys’ 100m | 11.00 | 9 qB | 10.90 | 11 |

Field Events

| Athletes | Event | Qualification | | Final | |
| Athletes | Event | Result | Rank | Result | Rank |
|---|---|---|---|---|---|
| Chao-Tsun Cheng | Boys’ Javelin Throw | 68.27 | 11 qB | 65.94 | 12 |
| Chun-Hsien Hsiang | Boys’ High Jump | 2.10 | 6 Q | 2.11 | 6 |
| Hsiao-Wei Chen | Boys’ Pole Vault | 4.45 | 14 qB | 4.20 | 14 |

=== Girls ===
Track and Road Events

| Athletes | Event | Qualification | | Final | |
| Athletes | Event | Result | Rank | Result | Rank |
|---|---|---|---|---|---|
| Ching-Hsien Liao | Girls’ 100m | 12.18 | 10 qB | 11.88 | 9 |
| Wei Liang (SIN); Ching-Hsien Liao (TPE); Marina Zaiko (KAZ); Elina Mikhina (KAZ) | Girls’ Medley Relay | | | 2:15.01 | 5 |

Field Events

| Athletes | Event | Qualification | | Final | |
| Athletes | Event | Result | Rank | Result | Rank |
|---|---|---|---|---|---|
| Li-Chun Lai | Girls’ Shot Put | 13.57 | 9 qB | 13.40 | 11 |
| Chia-Jung Wen | Girls’ Javelin Throw | 40.64 | 13 qB | 44.96 | 11 |
| Chia-Lun Tsai | Girls’ Triple Jump | 11.79 | 12 qB | 11.94 | 10 |
| Meng-Chia Wu | Girls’ High Jump | 1.70 | 11 qB | 1.78 | 9 |

== Badminton ==
Boys

| Athlete | Event | Group Stage | | | | Knock-Out Stage | | | |
| Athlete | Event | Match 1 | Match 2 | Match 3 | Rank | Quarterfinal | Semifinal | Final | Rank |
|---|---|---|---|---|---|---|---|---|---|
| Hsieh Feng-tse | Boys’ Singles | Kariyawasam (SRI) W 2-0 (21-12, 21-14) | Lehikoinen (FIN) W 2-0 (21-14, 21-14) | Ma (AUS) W 2-0 (21-5, 21-12) | 1 Q | Kumar (IND) L 1-2 (13-21, 21-18, 22-24) | Did not advance | | =5 |

Girls

| Athlete | Event | Group Stage | | | | Knock-Out Stage | | | |
| Athlete | Event | Match 1 | Match 2 | Match 3 | Rank | Quarterfinal | Semifinal | Final | Rank |
|---|---|---|---|---|---|---|---|---|---|
| Chiang Mei-hui | Girls’ Singles | Handunkuttihettige (SRI) W 2-0 (21-9, 21-19) | Tapumanaia (TUV) W 2-0 (21-1, 21-4) | Taerattanachai (THA) L 0-2 (13-21, 7-21) | 2 | Did not advance | | | |

== Judo ==
Individual

| Athlete | Event | Round 1 | Round 2 | Round 3 | Semifinals | Final | Rank |
| Athlete | Event | Opposition Result | Opposition Result | Opposition Result | Opposition Result | Opposition Result | Rank |
|---|---|---|---|---|---|---|---|
| Yu-Chun Wu | Girls' -52 kg | BYE | Dmitrieva (RUS); L 001-011 | Repechage; Prince (NED); L 001-010 | Did not advance | | 9 |

Team

| Team | Event | Round 1 | Round 2 | Semifinals | Final | Rank |
| Team | Event | Opposition Result | Opposition Result | Opposition Result | Opposition Result | Rank |
|---|---|---|---|---|---|---|
| Barcelona; Julia Rosso-Richetto (FRA); Subash Yadav (IND); Yu-Chun Wu (TPE); Maxamillian Schneider (USA); Natalia Rak (EST); Michael Greiter (AUT); Gulnoza Matniyazova (UZB); Bolot Toktogonov (KGZ) | Mixed Team | Osaka; L 3-5 | Did not advance | | | 9 |

== Shooting ==
Pistol

| Athlete | Event | Qualification | | Final | | |
| Athlete | Event | Score | Rank | Score | Total | Rank |
|---|---|---|---|---|---|---|
| Shao Chien Tien | Boys' 10m Air Pistol | 559 | 15 | Did not advance | | |

== Swimming ==
| Athletes | Event | Heat | | Semifinal | | Final | |
| Athletes | Event | Time | Position | Time | Position | Time | Position |
|---|---|---|---|---|---|---|---|
| Chien-Lung Lin | Boys’ 200m Backstroke | 2:08.85 | 14 | | | Did not advance | |
| Ting Chen | Girls’ 50m Backstroke | 30.88 | 13 Q | 31.03 | 14 | Did not advance | |
| Ting Chen | Girls’ 100m Backstroke | 1:07.32 | 28 | Did not advance | | | |
| Ting Chen | Girls’ 200m Butterfly | 2:20.58 | 16 | | | Did not advance | |
| Ting Chen | Girls’ 200m Individual Medley | 2:23.04 | 14 | | | Did not advance | |

== Table tennis ==
Individual

| Athlete | Event | Round 1 | | Round 2 | | Quarterfinals | Semifinals | Final | Rank |
| Athlete | Event | Group Matches | Rank | Group Matches | Rank | Quarterfinals | Semifinals | Final | Rank |
|---|---|---|---|---|---|---|---|---|---|
| Tsu-Hsiang Hung | Boys' Singles | Hmam (TUN); W 3-0 (11-8, 11-9, 11-8) | 1 Q | Bajger (CZE); W 3-1 (11-6, 11-6, 8-11, 11-5) | 1 Q | Chiu (HKG); W 4-3 (11-7, 8-11, 10-12, 8-11, 11-5, 11-3, 11-6) | Lakatos (HUN); W 4-0 (11-3, 11-8, 11-3, 11-8) | Niwa (JPN); L 2-4 (11-9, 8-11, 11-13, 15-13, 7-11, 13-15) | Silver medal |
| Tsu-Hsiang Hung | Boys' Singles | Chew (SIN); W 3-0 (11-6, 11-4, 11-8) | 1 Q | Vanrossomme (BEL); W 3-1 (11-5, 11-4, 10-12, 11-3) | 1 Q | Chiu (HKG); W 4-3 (11-7, 8-11, 10-12, 8-11, 11-5, 11-3, 11-6) | Lakatos (HUN); W 4-0 (11-3, 11-8, 11-3, 11-8) | Niwa (JPN); L 2-4 (11-9, 8-11, 11-13, 15-13, 7-11, 13-15) | Silver medal |
| Tsu-Hsiang Hung | Boys' Singles | Massah (MAW); W 3-0 (11-6, 11-4, 11-6) | 1 Q | Kim (PRK); W 3-0 (11-7, 11-9, 11-9) | 1 Q | Chiu (HKG); W 4-3 (11-7, 8-11, 10-12, 8-11, 11-5, 11-3, 11-6) | Lakatos (HUN); W 4-0 (11-3, 11-8, 11-3, 11-8) | Niwa (JPN); L 2-4 (11-9, 8-11, 11-13, 15-13, 7-11, 13-15) | Silver medal |
| Hsin Huang | Girls' Singles | Noskova (RUS); L 0-3 (15-17, 5-11, 7-11) | 3 qB | Wu (NZL); W 3-0 (11-4, 11-5, 11-4) | 1 | Did not advance | | | 17 |
| Hsin Huang | Girls' Singles | Rosheuvel (GUY); W 3-0 (11-6, 11-4, 11-2) | 3 qB | Galic (SLO); W 3-1 (11-7, 11-3, 11-13, 11-9) | 1 | Did not advance | | | 17 |
| Hsin Huang | Girls' Singles | Kumahara (BRA); L 0-3 (9-11, 8-11, 6-11) | 3 qB | Vithanage (SRI); W 3-0 (11-1, 11-5, 14-12) | 1 | Did not advance | | | 17 |

Team

| Athlete | Event | Round 1 | | Round 2 | Quarterfinals | Semifinals | Final | Rank |
| Athlete | Event | Group Matches | Rank | Round 2 | Quarterfinals | Semifinals | Final | Rank |
|---|---|---|---|---|---|---|---|---|
| Chinese Taipei; Huang (TPE); Hung (TPE) | Mixed Team | Pan America 2 Cordero (PUR); Saragovi (ARG); W 3-0 (3-0, 3-0, 3-0) | 1 Q | Hungary; Nagyvaradi (HUN); Lakatos (HUN); W 2-0 (3-2, 3-1) | Intercontinental 1 Gu (CHN); Hmam (TUN); L 1-2 (0-3, 3-0, 1-3) | Did not advance | | 5 |
| Chinese Taipei; Huang (TPE); Hung (TPE) | Mixed Team | Croatia; Jeger (CRO); Fucec (CRO); W 3-0 (3-1, 3-1, 3-0) | 1 Q | Hungary; Nagyvaradi (HUN); Lakatos (HUN); W 2-0 (3-2, 3-1) | Intercontinental 1 Gu (CHN); Hmam (TUN); L 1-2 (0-3, 3-0, 1-3) | Did not advance | | 5 |
| Chinese Taipei; Huang (TPE); Hung (TPE) | Mixed Team | New Zealand; Wu (NZL); Wu (NZL); W 3-0 (3-0, 3-0, 3-0) | 1 Q | Hungary; Nagyvaradi (HUN); Lakatos (HUN); W 2-0 (3-2, 3-1) | Intercontinental 1 Gu (CHN); Hmam (TUN); L 1-2 (0-3, 3-0, 1-3) | Did not advance | | 5 |

== Taekwondo ==
| Athlete | Event | Preliminary | Quarterfinal | Semifinal | Final | Rank |
|---|---|---|---|---|---|---|
| Jo-Wei Lin | Girls' +63kg | BYE | Faiza Taoussara (FRA); L 3-4 | Did not advance | | 5 |

== Tennis ==
Singles

| Athlete | Event | Round 1 | Round 2 | Quarterfinals | Semifinals | Final | Rank |
|---|---|---|---|---|---|---|---|
| Liang-Chi Huang | Boys' Singles | Krainik (CAN); W 2-0 (6-0, 6-1) | Bhambri (IND); L 0-2 (2-6, 4-6) | Did not advance | | | |

Doubles

| Athlete | Event | Round 1 | Quarterfinals | Semifinals | Final | Rank |
|---|---|---|---|---|---|---|
| Liang-Chi Huang (TPE); Yasutaka Uchiyama (JPN) | Boys' Doubles | Galeano (PAR); Rodriguez (VEN); L 0-2 (4-6, 4-6) | Did not advance | | | |

== Weightlifting ==
| Athlete | Event | Snatch | Clean & Jerk | Total | Rank |
|---|---|---|---|---|---|
| Yi-Yuan Huang | Boys' 77kg | 112 | 149 | 261 | 5 |
| Hsing-Chun Kuo | Girls' 53kg | 77 | 97 | 174 | Silver medal |
| Chi-Ling Yao | Girls' +63kg | 100 | 133 | 233 | 4 |
