= Sri Lanka at the 2010 Summer Youth Olympics =

- IOC code: SRI
- NOC: National Olympic Committee of Sri Lanka

in Singapore
- Competitors: 7 in 4 sports
- Flag bearer: Heshan Unamboowe
- Medals: Gold 0 Silver 0 Bronze 0 Total 0

Summer Youth Olympics appearances
- 2010; 2014; 2018

Sri Lanka participated in the 2010 Summer Youth Olympics in Singapore. Sri Lanka qualified 7 athletes in 4 sports.

== Athletics ==
Sri Lanka qualified 1 athlete in athletics.

Boys
Track and Road Events

Athletes	Event	Qualification		Final	
Athletes	Event	Result	Rank	Result	Rank
Indunil Herath	Boys’ 1000m	2:30.83	14 qB	2:27.57	13, PB, NR

== Badminton ==
Sri Lanka qualified 2 athletes in badminton.

Boys

Athlete	Event	Group Stage				Knock-Out Stage			
Athlete	Event	Match 1	Match 2	Match 3	Rank	Quarterfinal	Semifinal	Final	Rank
Dilshan Kariyawasam	Boys’ Singles	Hsieh (TPE) L 0-2 (12-21, 14-21)	Ma (AUS) W 2-0 (21-14, 21-5)	Lehhikoinen (FIN) L 0-2 (8-21, 18-21)	3	Did not advance			

Girls

Athlete	Event	Group Stage				Knock-Out Stage			
Athlete	Event	Match 1	Match 2	Match 3	Rank	Quarterfinal	Semifinal	Final	Rank
Lekha Handunkuttihettige	Girls’ Singles	Chiang (TPE) L 0-2 (9-21, 19-21)	Taerattanachai (THA) L 0-2 (13-21, 9-21)	Tapumanaia (TUV) W 2-0 (21-1, 21-7)	3	Did not advance			

== Swimming ==
Sri Lanka qualified 2 athletes in swimming.

Athletes	Event	Heat		Semifinal		Final	
Athletes	Event	Time	Position	Time	Position	Time	Position
Heshan Unamboowe	Boys’ 50m Backstroke			27.70	11	Did not advance	
Heshan Unamboowe	Boys’ 100m Backstroke	59.75	24	Did not advance			
Madhawee Weerathunga	Girls’ 50m Freestyle	29.71	45	Did not advance			
Madhawee Weerathunga	Girls’ 100m Freestyle	1:05.38	49	Did not advance			

== Table tennis ==
Individual

Athlete	Event	Round 1		Round 2		Quarterfinals	Semifinals	Final	Rank
Athlete	Event	Group Matches	Rank	Group Matches	Rank	Quarterfinals	Semifinals	Final	Rank
Hasintha Arsa Marakkala	Boys' Singles	Bajger (CZE); L 2-3 (13-15, 8-11, 11-9, 11-8, 9-11)	4 qB	Bedair (EGY); L 2-3 (8-11, 12-10, 11-8, 8-11, 12-14)	3	Did not advance			25
Hasintha Arsa Marakkala	Boys' Singles	Santiwattanatarm (THA); L 2-3 (7-11, 14-12, 12-10, 9-11, 5-11)	4 qB	Massah (MAW); W 3-0 (11-3, 11-3, 11-5)	3	Did not advance			25
Hasintha Arsa Marakkala	Boys' Singles	Chiu (HKG); L 0-3 (7-11, 4-11, 9-11)	4 qB	Mutti (ITA); L 0-3 (11-13, 5-11, 6-11)	3	Did not advance			25
Nuwani Vithanage	Girls' Singles	Ng (HKG); L 0-3 (4-11, 8-11, 4-11)	4 qB	Galic (SLO); L 1-3 (6-11, 11-5, 8-11, 8-11)	3	Did not advance			25
Nuwani Vithanage	Girls' Singles	Cordero (PUR); L 2-3 (11-8, 8-11, 4-11, 11-8, 9-11)	4 qB	Wu (NZL); W 3-0 (11-7, 11-8, 11-8)	3	Did not advance			25
Nuwani Vithanage	Girls' Singles	Hsing (USA); L 1-3 (9-11, 5-11, 11-6, 9-11)	4 qB	Huang (TPE); L 0-3 (1-11, 5-11, 12-14)	3	Did not advance			25

Team

Athlete	Event	Round 1		Round 2	Quarterfinals	Semifinals	Final	Rank
Athlete	Event	Group Matches	Rank	Round 2	Quarterfinals	Semifinals	Final	Rank
Sri Lanka; Nuwani Vithanage (SRI); Hasintha Arsa Marakkala (SRI)	Mixed Team	Thailand; Sawettabut (THA); Santiwattanatarm (THA); L 0-3 (0-3, 2-3, 0-3)	4 qB	Europe 5 Baravok (BLR); Bajger (CZE); L 0-2 (2-3, 2-3)	Did not advance			25
Sri Lanka; Nuwani Vithanage (SRI); Hasintha Arsa Marakkala (SRI)	Mixed Team	India; Bhandarkar (IND); Das (IND); L 0-3 (0-3, 2-3, 2-3)	4 qB	Europe 5 Baravok (BLR); Bajger (CZE); L 0-2 (2-3, 2-3)	Did not advance			25
Sri Lanka; Nuwani Vithanage (SRI); Hasintha Arsa Marakkala (SRI)	Mixed Team	Hong Kong; Ng (HKG); Chiu (HKG); L 0-3 (1-3, 2-3, 1-3)	4 qB	Europe 5 Baravok (BLR); Bajger (CZE); L 0-2 (2-3, 2-3)	Did not advance			25
