= Croatia at the 2010 Summer Youth Olympics =

- IOC code: CRO
- NOC: Croatian Olympic Committee
- Website: www.hoo.hr

in Singapore
- Competitors: 25 in 12 sports
- Flag bearer: Ivan Horvat
- Medals Ranked 42nd: Gold 1 Silver 1 Bronze 1 Total 3

Summer Youth Olympics appearances (overview)
- 2010; 2014; 2018

Croatia competed at the 2010 Summer Youth Olympics in Singapore.

The Croatian squad consisted of 25 athletes competing in 12 sports: aquatics (swimming), athletics, basketball, canoeing, gymnastics, judo, rowing, shooting, table tennis, taekwondo, tennis, and triathlon.

== Medalists ==
Medal	Name	Sport	Event	Date
Gold	Ivan Capan	Swimming	Boys' 50m Breaststroke	19 Aug
Silver	Matej Buovac; Tomislav Grubišić; Stipe Krstanović; Marko Ramljak	Basketball	Boys' Tournament	23 Aug
Bronze	Barbara Matić	Judo	Girls' 63kg	22 Aug
Bronze	Barbara Matić	Judo	Mixed Team	25 Aug

== Athletics ==
=== Boys ===
Field Events

Athletes	Event	Qualification		Final	
Athletes	Event	Result	Rank	Result	Rank
Ivan Horvat	Boys’ Pole Vault	4.70	2 Q	4.70	8

=== Girls ===
Track and Road Events

Athletes	Event	Qualification		Final	
Athletes	Event	Result	Rank	Result	Rank
Romana Tea Kirinić	Girls’ 400m	55.08	9 qB	55.59	9

Field Events

Athletes	Event	Qualification		Final	
Athletes	Event	Result	Rank	Result	Rank
Ines Ikić	Girls’ Triple Jump	12.37	5 Q	12.54	5

== Basketball ==
Boys

Squad List	Event	Group Stage		Placement Stage			Rank
Squad List	Event	Group D	Rank	1st–8th	1st–4th	1st–2nd	Rank
Tomislav Grubisic; Matej Buovac; Marko Ramljak (C); Stipe Krstanovic	Boys' Basketball	Spain; W 29–27	1	Israel; W 24–21	Greece; W 33–30	Serbia; L 9–22	Silver medal
Tomislav Grubisic; Matej Buovac; Marko Ramljak (C); Stipe Krstanovic	Boys' Basketball	South Africa; W 33–4	1	Israel; W 24–21	Greece; W 33–30	Serbia; L 9–22	Silver medal
Tomislav Grubisic; Matej Buovac; Marko Ramljak (C); Stipe Krstanovic	Boys' Basketball	Philippines; W 22–19	1	Israel; W 24–21	Greece; W 33–30	Serbia; L 9–22	Silver medal
Tomislav Grubisic; Matej Buovac; Marko Ramljak (C); Stipe Krstanovic	Boys' Basketball	Virgin Islands; W 27–17	1	Israel; W 24–21	Greece; W 33–30	Serbia; L 9–22	Silver medal

== Canoeing ==
Boys

Athlete	Event	Time Trial		Round 1	Round 2 (Rep)	Round 3	Round 4	Round 5	Final
Athlete	Event	Time	Rank	Round 1	Round 2 (Rep)	Round 3	Round 4	Round 5	Final
Matija Buriša	Boys’ C1 Slalom	2:01.84	9	Sokol (POL); L 1:55.34-1:54.90	Chimbumba (ANG); W 1:59.26-2:19.23	Queiroz (BRA); L 1:58.64-1:51.66	Did not advance		
Matija Buriša	Boys’ C1 Sprint	1:59.77	10	Liferi (ROU); L 1:59.78-1:50.58	Soeter (GER); W 2:08.64-2:42.83	Melnyk (UKR); L 2:01.89-1:45.85	Did not advance		

== Gymnastics ==
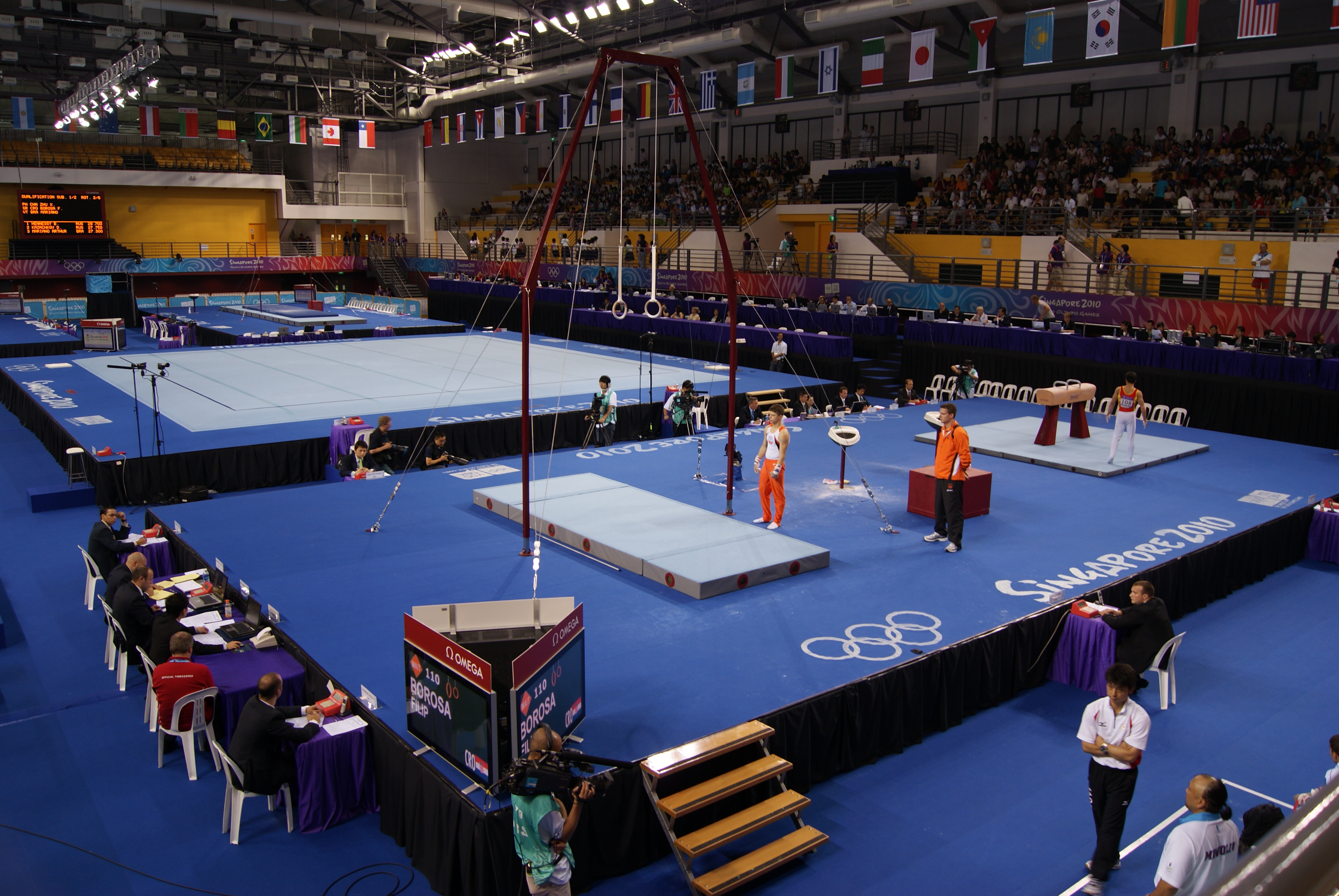
Boroša about to perform on the rings at the Bishan Sports Hall, Singapore, on 16 August 2010

=== Artistic Gymnastics ===
Boys

Athlete	Event	Floor		Pommel Horse		Rings		Vault		Parallel Bars		Horizontal Bar		Total	
Athlete	Event	Score	Rank	Score	Rank	Score	Rank	Score	Rank	Score	Rank	Score	Rank	Score	Rank
Filip Boroša	Boys' Qualification	14.050	8 Q	12.950	23	12.450	31	14.750	30	12.400	29	11.900	38	78.500	31

Athlete	Event	Score	Rank
Filip Boroša	Boys' Floor	13.600	6

== Judo ==
Individual

Athlete	Event	Round 1	Round 2	Round 3	Semifinals	Final	Rank
Athlete	Event	Opposition Result	Opposition Result	Opposition Result	Opposition Result	Opposition Result	Rank
Barbara Matić	Girls' −63 kg	BYE	Vertus (HAI); W 101–000	Incedayi (TUR); W 010–000	Tashiro (JPN); L 001–100	Bronze Medal Match; Matniyazova (UZB); W 001–000	

Team

Team	Event	Round 1	Round 2	Semifinals	Final	Rank
Team	Event	Opposition Result	Opposition Result	Opposition Result	Opposition Result	Rank
Cairo; Neha Thakur (IND); Mansurkhuja Muminkhujaev (UZB); Christine Huck (AUT); Ioan Visan (ROU); Andrea Guillen (CRC); Eldin Omerovic (BIH); Barbara Matić (CRO); Pedro Pineda (VEN)	Mixed Team	Birmington; W 5–2	Hamilton; W 4–4 (3–2)	Essen; L 2–5	Did not advance	Bronze medal

== Rowing ==
Athlete	Event	Heats		Repechage		Semifinals		Final		Overall Rank
Athlete	Event	Time	Rank	Time	Rank	Time	Rank	Time	Rank	Overall Rank
Mile Cakarun; Mate Ledenko	Boys' Pair	3:14.96	2 QA/B			3:18.36	4 QB	3:15.56	3	9
Ašja Žero	Girls' Single Sculls	3:51.21	2 QR	4:00.95	2 QA/B	4:00.78	5 QB	3:50.13	2	8

== Shooting ==
Pistol

Athlete	Event	Qualification		Final		
Athlete	Event	Score	Rank	Score	Total	Rank
Valentina Pereglin	Girls' 10m Air Pistol	369	12	Did not advance		

Rifle

Athlete	Event	Qualification		Final		
Athlete	Event	Score	Rank	Score	Total	Rank
Tiziano Suran	Boys' 10m Air Rifle	586	10	Did not advance		
Tanja Perec	Girls' 10m Air Rifle	393	5 Q	101.2	494.2	6

== Swimming ==
Athletes	Event	Heat		Semifinal		Final	
Athletes	Event	Time	Position	Time	Position	Time	Position
Ivan Levaj	Boys' 50m Freestyle	23.34	5 Q	23.09	4 Q	23.11	5
Ivan Levaj	Boys' 100m Freestyle	51.23	5 Q	51.75	13	Did not advance	
Ivan Biondic	Boys' 100m Backstroke	57.34	5 Q	57.33	6 Q	56.88	6
Ivan Biondic	Boys' 200m Backstroke	2:03.67	3 Q			2:03.40	4
Ivan Capan	Boys' 50m Breaststroke	29.15	4 Q	29.10	5 Q	28.55	Gold medal
Ivan Capan	Boys' 100m Breaststroke	1:03.21	3 Q	1:03.14	4 Q	1:03.24	5
Mabel Sulic	Girls' 100m Backstroke	1:07.50	29	Did not advance			
Mabel Sulic	Girls' 200m Backstroke	2:23.36	24			Did not advance	

== Table tennis ==
Individual

Athlete	Event	Round 1		Round 2		Quarterfinals	Semifinals	Final	Rank
Athlete	Event	Group Matches	Rank	Group Matches	Rank	Quarterfinals	Semifinals	Final	Rank
Luka Fucec	Boys' Singles	Kam (MRI); W 3–0 (11–6, 11–7, 12–10)	2 Q	Chiu (HKG); L 2–3 (12–10, 5–11, 9–11, 11–9, 7–11)	3	Did not advance			9
Luka Fucec	Boys' Singles	Soderlund (SWE); L 0–3 (11–13, 7–11, 6–11)	2 Q	Kulpa (POL); W 3–2 (6–11, 2–11, 11–9, 11–8, 13–11)	3	Did not advance			9
Luka Fucec	Boys' Singles	Gavilan (PAR); W 3–2 (12–14, 11–3, 11–9, 9–11, 12–10)	2 Q	Gauzy (FRA); L 2–3 (81–11, 11–8, 11–6, 7–11, 3–11)	3	Did not advance			9
Mateja Jeger	Girls' Singles	Galic (SLO); W 3–1 (5–11, 12–10, 11–4, 12–10)	1 Q	Hsing (USA); L 2–3 (7–11, 7–11, 11–5, 14–12, 7–11)	3	Did not advance			9
Mateja Jeger	Girls' Singles	Meshref (EGY); W 3–0 (12–10, 11–5, 13–11)	1 Q	Yang (KOR); W 3–1 (11–8, 11–6, 6–11, 11–8)	3	Did not advance			9
Mateja Jeger	Girls' Singles	Phan (AUS); W 3–1 (11–4, 5–11, 11–5, 12–10)	1 Q	Li (SIN); L 0–3 (8–11, 6–11, 8–11)	3	Did not advance			9

Team

Athlete	Event	Round 1		Round 2	Quarterfinals	Semifinals	Final	Rank
Athlete	Event	Group Matches	Rank	Round 2	Quarterfinals	Semifinals	Final	Rank
Croatia; Mateja Jeger (CRO); Luka Fucec (CRO)	Mixed Team	New Zealand; Wu (NZL); Wu (NZL); W 3–0 (3–0, 3–1, 3–1)	2 Q	Thailand; Sawettabut (THA); Satiwattanatarm (THA); L 0–2 (0–3, 2–3)	Did not advance			9
Croatia; Mateja Jeger (CRO); Luka Fucec (CRO)	Mixed Team	Chinese Taipei; Huang (TPE); Hung (TPE); L 0–3 (1–3, 1–3, 0–3)	2 Q	Thailand; Sawettabut (THA); Satiwattanatarm (THA); L 0–2 (0–3, 2–3)	Did not advance			9
Croatia; Mateja Jeger (CRO); Luka Fucec (CRO)	Mixed Team	Pan America 2 Cordero (PUR); Saragovi (ARG); W 3–0 (3–0, 3–1, 3–0)	2 Q	Thailand; Sawettabut (THA); Satiwattanatarm (THA); L 0–2 (0–3, 2–3)	Did not advance			9

== Taekwondo ==
Athlete	Event	Preliminary	Quarterfinal	Semifinal	Final	Rank
Rea Budic	Girls' −63kg	Kadiatiu Diallo (MLI); W RSC R1 0:35	Soo Yeon Jeon (KOR); L 3–11	Did not advance		5

== Tennis ==
Singles

Athlete	Event	Round 1	Round 2	Quarterfinals	Semifinals	Final	Rank
Mate Pavić	Boys' Singles	Mikhail Biryukov (RUS); L 0–2 (3–6, 3–6)	Consolation; Stefan Micov (MKD); L 1–2 (6–7, 7–5, [7–10])	Did not advance			

Doubles

Athlete	Event	Round 1	Quarterfinals	Semifinals	Final	Rank
Damir Džumhur (BIH); Mate Pavić (CRO)	Boys' Doubles	Yuki Bhambri (IND); Jeson Patrombon (PHI); W 2–1 (6–7, 7–5, [10–4])	Golding (GBR); Vesely (CZE); L 0–2 (6–7, 5–7)	Did not advance		

== Triathlon ==
Girls

Triathlete	Event	Swimming	Transit 1	Cycling	Transit 2	Running	Total time	Rank
Sara Vilić	Individual	9:34	0:37	33:12	0:27	23:46	1:07:36.84	23

Mixed

Athlete	Event	Total Times per Athlete (Swim 250 m, Bike 7 km, Run 1.7 km)	Total Group Time	Rank
Sara Vilic (CRO); Abrahm Louw (NAM); Andrea Brown (ZIM); Wian Sullwald (RSA)	Mixed Team Relay; World Team 1	21:23; 19:07; 23:11; 19:56	1:23:37.79	9
