= Swimming at the 2010 Summer Youth Olympics – Girls' 50 metre freestyle =

The girls' 50 metre freestyle event at the 2010 Youth Olympic Games took place on August 19 and the final on August 20, at the Singapore Sports School.

== Medalists ==
Gold	Tang Yi; China	25.40
Gold	Anna Santamans; France	25.40
Bronze	Emma McKeon; Australia	25.61

== Heats ==
=== Heat 1 ===
Rank	Lane	Name	Nationality	Time	Notes
1	5	Madhawee Weerathunga	Sri Lanka	29.71	
2	4	Zahra Pinto	Malawi	31.08	
3	3	Dahirou Zoubaydat	Cameroon	45.22	

=== Heat 2 ===
Rank	Lane	Name	Nationality	Time	Notes
1	4	Zeineb Khalfallah	Tunisia	27.19	
2	3	Kathryn Millin	Swaziland	28.50	
3	6	Mercedes Milner	Zambia	28.93	
4	5	Maria Lopez	Bolivia	29.93	
5	2	Ayesha Marie Noel	Grenada	30.96	
6	7	Angelika Ouedraogo	Burkina Faso	36.29	

=== Heat 3 ===
Rank	Lane	Name	Nationality	Time	Notes
1	3	Bria Deveaux	Bahamas	28.27	
2	6	Fabiola Espinoza	Nicaragua	28.90	
3	5	Celeste Brown	Cook Islands	29.40	
4	2	Mariam Foum	Tanzania	30.51	
5	1	Reni Jani	Albania	30.99	
6	8	Hagar Kabua	Marshall Islands	33.82	
7	7	Marie Claudine Iradukunda	Rwanda	39.62	
8	4	Josephine Blamo	Liberia	1:02.67	

=== Heat 4 ===
Rank	Lane	Name	Nationality	Time	Notes
1	4	Sylvia Tanya Atieno Brunlehna	Kenya	28.55	
2	5	Sabine Hazboun	Palestine	29.44	
3	3	Maria Gibbons	Palau	31.43	
4	8	Zeynab Ba	Senegal	31.85	
5	6	Jennet Saryyeva	Turkmenistan	32.27	
6	7	Rayleen David	Federated States of Micronesia	32.32	
7	2	Aminath Shajan	Maldives	32.81	
8	1	Yanet Gebremedhin	Ethiopia	34.84	

=== Heat 5 ===
Rank	Lane	Name	Nationality	Time	Notes
1	3	Maria Lopez Nery Huerta	Paraguay	27.98	
2	5	Bayan Jumah	Syria	28.18	
3	4	Amel Melih	Algeria	28.23	
4	8	Amanda Jia Xin Liew	Brunei	28.25	
5	2	Karlene Theodora	Netherlands Antilles	28.36	
6	1	Dayana Castro	Costa Rica	28.60	
7	6	Siona Huxley	Saint Lucia	28.81	
8	7	Rohane Crichton	Samoa	31.74	

=== Heat 6 ===
Rank	Lane	Name	Nationality	Time	Notes
1	5	Gabriela Ņikitina	Latvia	27.10	
2	7	Karen Sif Vilhjalmsdotter	Iceland	27.55	
3	2	Diana Chang	Ecuador	27.65	
4	3	Kiera Janzen	United States	27.93	
5	8	Hristina Muncheva	Bulgaria	27.97	
6	6	Tiana Tasevska	Macedonia	28.11	
7	4	Maria Carolina da Costa Rosa	Portugal	28.38	
	1	Yulduz Kuchkarova	Uzbekistan		DSQ

=== Heat 7 ===
Rank	Lane	Name	Nationality	Time	Notes
1	5	Anna Santamans	France	25.74	Q
2	4	Emma McKeon	Australia	25.85	Q
3	3	Manon Minneboo	Netherlands	26.44	Q
4	2	Lotta Nevalainen	Finland	26.85	Q
5	6	Yu Wai Tang	Hong Kong	26.92	Q
6	7	Isabella Arcila	Colombia	27.04	Q
7	1	Ana de Pinho Rodrigues	Portugal	27.20	
8	8	Katarina Simonović	Serbia	27.23	

=== Heat 8 ===
Rank	Lane	Name	Nationality	Time	Notes
1	4	Alessandra Marchioro	Brazil	26.34	Q
2	5	Lovisa Eriksson	Sweden	26.41	Q
3	7	Ingibjorg Kristin Jonsdottir	Iceland	26.87	Q
4	2	Lauren Earp	Canada	26.96	Q
5	1	Chinyere Pigot	Suriname	27.00	Q
6	3	Lina Rathsack	Germany	27.07	Q
7	6	Katriin Kersa	Estonia	27.20	
8	8	Natalia Pawlaczek	Poland	27.42	

=== Heat 9 ===
Rank	Lane	Name	Nationality	Time	Notes
1	4	Tang Yi	China	26.00	Q
2	5	Carolina Bergamaschi	Brazil	26.35	Q
3	3	Amanda Lim	Singapore	26.61	Q
4	2	Nicol Samsonyk	Israel	26.91	Q
5	7	Jasmine Alkhaldi	Philippines	27.10	
7	8	Sarah Rolko	Luxembourg	27.45	
	1	Aksana Dziamidava	Belarus		DNS
	6	Sarah Wegria	Belgium		DNS

== Semifinals ==
=== Semifinal 1 ===
Rank	Lane	Name	Nationality	Time	Notes
1	4	Emma McKeon	Australia	25.60	Q
2	5	Alessandra Marchioro	Brazil	25.85	Q
3	6	Amanda Lim	Singapore	26.14	Q
4	3	Lovisa Eriksson	Sweden	26.32	Q
5	2	Ingibjorg Kristin Jonsdottir	Iceland	26.47	
6	7	Yu Wai Tang	Hong Kong	26.64	
7	1	Chinyere Pigot	Suriname	26.69	
8	8	Lina Rathsack	Germany	26.76	

=== Semifinal 2 ===
Rank	Lane	Name	Nationality	Time	Notes
1	4	Anna Santamans	France	25.48	Q
2	5	Tang Yi	China	25.68	Q
3	3	Carolina Bergamaschi	Brazil	26.13	Q
4	6	Manon Minneboo	Netherlands	26.25	Q
5	2	Lotta Nevalainen	Finland	26.60	
6	1	Lauren Earp	Canada	26.62	
7	7	Nicol Samsonyk	Israel	27.01	
8	8	Isabella Arcila	Colombia	29.77	

== Final ==
Rank	Lane	Name	Nationality	Time	Notes
1st place, gold medalist(s)	3	Tang Yi	China	25.40	
1st place, gold medalist(s)	4	Anna Santamans	France	25.40	
3rd place, bronze medalist(s)	5	Emma McKeon	Australia	25.61	
4	6	Alessandra Marchioro	Brazil	25.92	
5	8	Lovisa Eriksson	Sweden	25.96	
6	7	Amanda Lim	Singapore	26.05	
7	2	Carolina Bergamaschi	Brazil	26.24	
8	1	Manon Minneboo	Netherlands	26.35	
