= Hong Kong at the 2010 Summer Youth Olympics =

- IOC code: HKG
- NOC: Sports Federation and Olympic Committee of Hong Kong, China

in Singapore
- Competitors: 14 in 7 sports
- Flag bearer: Lum Ching Tat
- Medals Ranked 74th: Gold 0 Silver 1 Bronze 0 Total 1

Summer Youth Olympics appearances (overview)
- 2010; 2014; 2018

Hong Kong participated in the 2010 Summer Youth Olympics in Singapore.

The Hong Kong delegation consisted of 14 athletes competing in 7 sports: aquatics (swimming), athletics, equestrian, fencing, sailing, table tennis and triathlon.

== Medalists ==
| Medal | Name | Sport | Event | Date |
|---|---|---|---|---|
| Silver | Jasmine Zin Man Lai | Equestrian | Team Jumping | 20 Aug |
| Silver | Chun Leung Michael Cheng | Sailing | Boys' Techno 293 | 25 Aug |

== Athletics ==
=== Girls ===
Field Events

| Athletes | Event | Qualification | | Final | |
| Athletes | Event | Result | Rank | Result | Rank |
|---|---|---|---|---|---|
| Wai Yee Fung | Girls’ High Jump | 1.70 | 13 qB | 1.65 | 13 |

== Equestrian ==
| Athlete | Horse | Event | Round 1 | | | Round 2 | | | Total | Jump-Off | | Rank |
| Athlete | Horse | Event | Penalties | | Rank | Penalties | | Rank | Total | Penalties | Time | Rank |
| Athlete | Horse | Event | Jump | Time | Rank | Jump | Time | Rank | Total | Penalties | Time | Rank |
|---|---|---|---|---|---|---|---|---|---|---|---|---|
| Jasmine Zin Man Lai | Butterfly Kisses | Individual Jumping | 8 | 0 | 16 | 4 | 0 | 8 | 12 | | | 17 |
| Jasmine Zin Man Lai (HKG); Jake Lambert (NZL); Xu Zhengyang (CHN); Sultan Al Tooqi (OMA); Thomas McDermott (AUS) | Butterfly Kisses; Le Lucky; Foxdale Villarni; Joondooree Farms Damiro; Hugo | Team Jumping | ~~12~~; 0; ~~16~~; 4; 0 | ~~0~~; 0; ~~0~~; 0; 0 | 1 | 4; 0; ~~20~~; ~~4~~; 0 | 0; 0; ~~0~~; ~~0~~; 0 | 2 | 8 | 0; ~~12~~; 0; 4; ~~8~~ | 50.57; ~~46.13~~; 51.46; 52.23; ~~46.10~~ | Silver medal |

== Fencing ==
Group Stage

| Athlete | Event | Match 1 | Match 2 | Match 3 | Match 4 | Match 5 | Match 6 | Seed |
|---|---|---|---|---|---|---|---|---|
| Nicholas Edward Choi | Boys’ Foil | Massialas (USA); L 3-5 | Choupenitch (CZE); W 5-0 | Tsoronis (DEN); W 5-4 | Babaoglu (TUR); L 4-5 | Rosabal (CUB); L 1-5 | Ong (SIN); W 5-4 | 6 |
| Jackson Wang | Boys’ Sabre | Hubers (GER); L 1-5 | Zatko (FRA); L 2-5 | Sirbu (ROU); L 4-5 | Akula (BLR); L 1-5 | Elsissy (EGY); W 5-2 | Kondo (NIG); W 5-0 | 10 |

Knock-Out Stage

| Athlete | Event | Round of 16 | Quarterfinals | Semifinals | Final | Rank |
|---|---|---|---|---|---|---|
| Nicholas Edward Choi | Boys’ Foil | Tsoronis (DEN); L 9-15 | Did not advance | | | 9 |
| Jackson Wang | Boys’ Sabre | Okunev (RUS); L 14-15 | Did not advance | | | 11 |
| Asia-Oceania 2 Wan Yini (CHN); Kirill Zhakupov (KAZ); Wang Lianlian (CHN); Jackson Wang (HKG); Hye Won Lee (KOR); Nicholas Edward Choi (HKG) | Mixed Team | | Europe 2 L 21-30 | 5th-8th Europe 4 L 20-30 | 7th-8th Americas 2 L 27-28 | 8 |

== Sailing ==
Windsurfing

| Athlete | Event | Race | | | | | | | | | | | Points | Rank |
| Athlete | Event | 1 | 2 | 3 | 4 | 5 | 6 | 7 | 8 | 9 | 10 | M* | Points | Rank |
|---|---|---|---|---|---|---|---|---|---|---|---|---|---|---|
| Chun Leung Michael Cheng | Boys' Techno 293 | 2 | 5 | 3 | 4 | 3 | 1 | 2 | ~~7~~ | 3 | 3 | 5 | 31 | Silver medal |
| Ka Kei Man | Girls' Techno 293 | 8 | 10 | 7 | 7 | 7 | ~~OCS~~ | 6 | 5 | 9 | 9 | 10 | 78 | 9 |

== Swimming ==
| Athletes | Event | Heat | | Semifinal | | Final | |
| Athletes | Event | Time | Position | Time | Position | Time | Position |
|---|---|---|---|---|---|---|---|
| Ching Tat Lum | Boys’ 50m Freestyle | 23.30 | 4 Q | 23.14 | 6 Q | 23.11 | 5 |
| Ching Tat Lum | Boys’ 100m Freestyle | 52.33 | 23 | Did not advance | | | |
| Kin Tat Kent Cheung | Boys’ 200m Freestyle | 1:54.15 | 19 | | | Did not advance | |
| Wai Ting Yu | Girls’ 50m Freestyle | 26.92 | 12 Q | 26.64 | 12 | Did not advance | |
| Yvette Man-Yi Kong | Girls’ 50m Breaststroke | 33.31 | 9 Q | 33.69 | 16 | Did not advance | |
| Yvette Man-Yi Kong | Girls’ 100m Breaststroke | 1:13.31 | 14 Q | 1:12.67 | 12 | Did not advance | |
| Yvette Man-Yi Kong | Girls’ 200m Breaststroke | 2:42.03 | 16 | | | Did not advance | |
| Ching Tat Lum; Kin Tat Kent Cheung; Wai Ting Yu; Yvette Man-Yi Kong | Mixed 4 × 100 m Freestyle Relay | 3:40.34 | 8 Q | | | 3:40.08 | 7 |
| Ching Tat Lum; Kin Tat Kent Cheung; Wai Ting Yu; Yvette Man-Yi Kong | Mixed 4 × 100 m Medley Relay | 4:14.66 | 13 | | | Did not advance | |

== Table tennis ==
Individual

| Athlete | Event | Round 1 | | Round 2 | | Quarterfinals | Semifinals | Final | Rank |
| Athlete | Event | Group Matches | Rank | Group Matches | Rank | Quarterfinals | Semifinals | Final | Rank |
|---|---|---|---|---|---|---|---|---|---|
| Chung Hei Chiu | Boys' Singles | Santiwattanatarm (THA); W 3-1 (11-7, 16-14, 10-12, 14-12) | 1 Q | Fucec (CRO); W 3-2 (10-12, 11-5, 11-9, 9-11, 11-7) | 2 Q | Hung (TPE); L 3-4 (7-11, 11-8, 12-10, 11-8, 5-11, 3-11, 6-11) | Did not advance | | 5 |
| Chung Hei Chiu | Boys' Singles | Bajger (CZE); W 3-0 (12-10, 11-5, 11-9) | 1 Q | Gauzy (FRA); L 1-3 (11-8, 4-11, 6-11, 5-11) | 2 Q | Hung (TPE); L 3-4 (7-11, 11-8, 12-10, 11-8, 5-11, 3-11, 6-11) | Did not advance | | 5 |
| Chung Hei Chiu | Boys' Singles | Marakkala (SRI); W 3-0 (11-7, 11-4, 11-9) | 1 Q | Kulpa (POL); W 3-2 (10-12, 11-4, 4-11, 11-2, 11-7) | 2 Q | Hung (TPE); L 3-4 (7-11, 11-8, 12-10, 11-8, 5-11, 3-11, 6-11) | Did not advance | | 5 |
| Ka Yee Ng | Girls' Singles | Vithanage (SRI); W 3-0 (11-4, 11-8, 11-4) | 1 Q | Szocs (ROU); W 3-0 (11-5, 11-8, 11-4) | 4 | Did not advance | | | 13 |
| Ka Yee Ng | Girls' Singles | Hsing (USA); W 3-2 (9-11, 11-7, 7-11, 11-9, 11-3) | 1 Q | Kim (PRK); L 1-3 (10-12, 11-9, 6-11, 9-11) | 4 | Did not advance | | | 13 |
| Ka Yee Ng | Girls' Singles | Cordero (PUR); W 3-1 (11-9, 8-11, 11-7, 12-10) | 1 Q | Xiao (POR); L 1-3 (15-13, 7-11, 3-11, 8-11) | 4 | Did not advance | | | 13 |

Team

| Athlete | Event | Round 1 | | Round 2 | Quarterfinals | Semifinals | Final | Rank |
| Athlete | Event | Group Matches | Rank | Round 2 | Quarterfinals | Semifinals | Final | Rank |
|---|---|---|---|---|---|---|---|---|
| Hong Kong; Ka Yee Ng (HKG); Chung Hei Chiu (HKG) | Mixed Team | India; Bhandarkar (IND); Das (IND); W 3-0 (3-0, 3-0, 3-0) | 2 Q | Japan; Tanioka (JPN); Niwa (JPN); L 0-2 (2-3, 2-3) | Did not advance | | | 9 |
| Hong Kong; Ka Yee Ng (HKG); Chung Hei Chiu (HKG) | Mixed Team | Thailand; Sawettabut (THA); Santiwattanatarm (THA); L 1-2 (2-3, 3-2, 1-3) | 2 Q | Japan; Tanioka (JPN); Niwa (JPN); L 0-2 (2-3, 2-3) | Did not advance | | | 9 |
| Hong Kong; Ka Yee Ng (HKG); Chung Hei Chiu (HKG) | Mixed Team | Sri Lanka; Vithanage (SRI); Marakkala (SRI); W 3-0 (3-1, 3-2, 3-1) | 2 Q | Japan; Tanioka (JPN); Niwa (JPN); L 0-2 (2-3, 2-3) | Did not advance | | | 9 |

== Triathlon ==
Girls

| Triathlete | Event | Swimming | Transit 1 | Cycling | Transit 2 | Running | Total time | Rank |
|---|---|---|---|---|---|---|---|---|
| Hui Wai Sum Vincci | Individual | 10:44 | 0:33 | 33:14 | 0:25 | 20:50 | 1:05:46.13 | 17 |

Men's

| Athlete | Event | Swim (1.5 km) | Trans 1 | Bike (40 km) | Trans 2 | Run (10 km) | Total | Rank |
|---|---|---|---|---|---|---|---|---|
| Law Leong Tim | Individual | 9:01 | 0:34 | 29:42 | 0:25 | 19:13 | 58:55.12 | 25 |

Mixed

| Athlete | Event | Total Times per Athlete (Swim 250 m, Bike 7 km, Run 1.7 km) | Total Group Time | Rank |
|---|---|---|---|---|
| Mingxiu Ma (CHN); Leong Tim Law (HKG); Karolina Solovyova (KAZ); Yuki Kubono (JPN) | Mixed Team Relay; Asia 2 | 22:55; 20:43; 23:54; 20:08 | 1:27:40.62 | 13 |
| Sato Yuka (JPN); Ji Hong Lee (KOR); Wai Sum Vincci Hui (HKG); Ru Cheng (CHN) | Mixed Team Relay; Asia 1 | 20:16; 20:06; 22:19; 20:39 | 1:23:20.88 | 8 |
