= Tunisia at the 2010 Summer Youth Olympics =

- IOC code: TUN
- NOC: Tunisian Olympic Committee
- Website: www.cnot.org.tn (in French)

in Singapore
- Competitors: 24 in 10 sports
- Flag bearer: Abir Barkaoui
- Medals: Gold 0 Silver 0 Bronze 0 Total 0

Summer Youth Olympics appearances (overview)
- 2010; 2014; 2018; 2026

Tunisia competed at the 2010 Summer Youth Olympics, the inaugural Youth Olympic Games, held in Singapore from 14 August to 26 August 2010.

== Medalists ==
Medal	Name	Sport	Event	Date
Bronze	Adem Hmam	Table Tennis	Mixed Team	26 Aug

The medal was won as Mixed NOCs therefore the medal doesn't count towards the overall count for Tunisia.

== Athletics ==
=== Boys ===
Track and Road Events

Athletes	Event	Qualification		Final	
Athletes	Event	Result	Rank	Result	Rank
Rami Gharsali	Boys’ 110m Hurdles	14.68	15 qC	DSQ	
Bacem Salhi	Boys’ 2000m Steeplechase	6:43.17	13 qB	6:39.07	14

=== Girls ===
Track and Road Events

Athletes	Event	Qualification		Final	
Athletes	Event	Result	Rank	Result	Rank
Salma Abdelhamid	Girls’ 100m Hurdles	14.61	14 qC	14.88	16
Abir Barkaoui	Girls’ 400m Hurdles	1:03.48	11 qB	1:03.90	12
Nour Sioud	Girls’ 2000m Steeplechase	7:04.61	8 Q	DNF	

Field Events

Athletes	Event	Qualification		Final	
Athletes	Event	Result	Rank	Result	Rank
Rahma Bouslama	Girls’ Discus Throw	39.46	12 qB	38.40	13
Ameni Ben Salem	Girls’ Javelin Throw	35.44	15 qB	36.46	15
Nabiha Gueddah	Girls’ Hammer Throw	43.92	17 qB	47.95	15
Dora Mahfoudhi	Girls’ Pole Vault	3.60	10 qB	3.45	12

== Canoeing ==
Girls

Athlete	Event	Time Trial		Round 1	Round 2 (Rep)	Round 3	Round 4	Round 5	Final
Athlete	Event	Time	Rank	Round 1	Round 2 (Rep)	Round 3	Round 4	Round 5	Final
Ben Ismail Afef	Girls’ K1 Slalom	1:52.33	10	Monleon (ESP); W 1:51.48-2:00.27		Grewelding (GER); L 2:00.26-1:44.47	Did not advance		
Ben Ismail Afef	Girls’ K1 Sprint	1:59.48	17	Peters (BEL); L 2:02.07-1:44.99	Hostens (FRA); L 1:57.33-1:49.82	Farkasdi (HUN); L 2:04.25-1:39.65	Did not advance		

== Rowing ==
Athlete	Event	Heats		Repechage		Semifinals		Final		Overall Rank
Athlete	Event	Time	Rank	Time	Rank	Time	Rank	Time	Rank	Overall Rank
Mohamed Fares Laouti	Boys' Single Sculls	3:37.29	6 QR	3:38.38	4 QC/D	3:47.69	3 QC	3:44.37	6	17

== Sailing ==
One Person Dinghy

Athlete	Event	Race												Points	Rank
Athlete	Event	1	2	3	4	5	6	7	8	9	10	11	M*	Points	Rank
Anis Elmjid	Boys' Byte CII	19	28	27	29	27	29	29	27	~~DNF~~	29	~~RAF~~	26	270	29

== Swimming ==
Athletes	Event	Heat		Semifinal		Final	
Athletes	Event	Time	Position	Time	Position	Time	Position
Fedy Hannachi	Boys’ 200m Freestyle	1:58.64	36			Did not advance	
Fedy Hannachi	Boys’ 400m Freestyle	4:11.70	26			Did not advance	
Wassim Elloumi	Boys’ 100m Breaststroke	1:05.49	17 Q*	1:05.45	16	Did not advance	
Wassim Elloumi	Boys’ 200m Breaststroke	2:26.92	16			Did not advance	
Zeineb Khalfallah	Girls’ 50m Freestyle	27.19	19	Did not advance			
Zeineb Khalfallah	Girls’ 100m Freestyle	58.37	16 Q	58.12	13	Did not advance	
Zeineb Khalfallah	Girls’ 200m Freestyle	2:05.56	14			Did not advance	
Zeineb Khalfallah	Girls’ 200m Individual Medley	2:23.81	15			Did not advance	
Nesrine Khelifati	Girls’ 400m Freestyle	4:37.37	24			Did not advance	
Nesrine Khelifati	Girls’ 200m Butterfly	2:20.67	17			Did not advance	

- * Qualified due to the withdrawal of another swimmer

== Table tennis ==
Individual

Athlete	Event	Round 1		Round 2		Quarterfinals	Semifinals	Final	Rank
Athlete	Event	Group Matches	Rank	Group Matches	Rank	Quarterfinals	Semifinals	Final	Rank
Adem Hmam	Boys' Singles	Hung (TPE); L 0-3 (8-11, 9-11, 8-11)	3 qB	Tapia (ECU); W 3-2 (3-11, 11-3, 11-8, 13-15, 11-9)	1	Did not advance			17
Adem Hmam	Boys' Singles	Massah (MAW); W 3-0 (11-3, 11-3, 11-5)	3 qB	Jouti (BRA); W 3-2 (11-8, 7-11, 11-9, 4-11, 11-7)	1	Did not advance			17
Adem Hmam	Boys' Singles	Chew (SIN); L 1-3 (7-11, 9-11, 13-11, 8-11)	3 qB	Saragovi (ARG); L 1-3 (1-11, 11-5, 8-11, 7-11)	1	Did not advance			17

Team

Athlete	Event	Round 1		Round 2	Quarterfinals	Semifinals	Final	Rank
Athlete	Event	Group Matches	Rank	Round 2	Quarterfinals	Semifinals	Final	Rank
Intercontinental 1 Gu Yuting (CHN); Adem Hmam (TUN)	Mixed Team	DPR Korea; Kim (PRK); Kim (PRK); W 2-1 (3-1, 0-3, 3-2)	1 Q	Europe 2 Xiao (POR); Vanrossomme (BEL); W 2-1 (3-0, 2-3, 3-2)	Chinese Taipei; Huang (TPE); Hung (TPE); W 2-1 (3-0, 0-3, 3-1)	Japan; Tanioka (JPN); Niwa (JPN); L 1-2 (3-0, 0-3, 1-3)	DPR Korea; Kim (PRK); Kim (PRK); W 2-1 (3-0, 2-3, 3-1)	Bronze medal
Intercontinental 1 Gu Yuting (CHN); Adem Hmam (TUN)	Mixed Team	Netherlands; Eerland (NED); Hageraats (NED); W 2-1 (3-0, 1-3, 3-1)	1 Q	Europe 2 Xiao (POR); Vanrossomme (BEL); W 2-1 (3-0, 2-3, 3-2)	Chinese Taipei; Huang (TPE); Hung (TPE); W 2-1 (3-0, 0-3, 3-1)	Japan; Tanioka (JPN); Niwa (JPN); L 1-2 (3-0, 0-3, 1-3)	DPR Korea; Kim (PRK); Kim (PRK); W 2-1 (3-0, 2-3, 3-1)	Bronze medal
Intercontinental 1 Gu Yuting (CHN); Adem Hmam (TUN)	Mixed Team	Pan America 3 Rosheuvel (GUY); Tapia (ECU); W 2-1 (3-0, 1-3, 3-0)	1 Q	Europe 2 Xiao (POR); Vanrossomme (BEL); W 2-1 (3-0, 2-3, 3-2)	Chinese Taipei; Huang (TPE); Hung (TPE); W 2-1 (3-0, 0-3, 3-1)	Japan; Tanioka (JPN); Niwa (JPN); L 1-2 (3-0, 0-3, 1-3)	DPR Korea; Kim (PRK); Kim (PRK); W 2-1 (3-0, 2-3, 3-1)	Bronze medal

== Taekwondo ==
Athlete	Event	Preliminary	Quarterfinal	Semifinal	Final	Rank
Ali Rahma Ben	Girls' -55kg	BYE	Thanh Thao Nguyen (VIE); L 1-3	Did not advance		5

== Tennis ==
Singles

Athlete	Event	Round 1	Round 2	Quarterfinals	Semifinals	Final	Rank
Ahmed Triki	Boys' Singles	Beretta (PER); L 0-2 (4-6, 4-6)	Consolation; Quiroz (ECU); W 2-1 (1-6, 6-4, [10-6])	Consolation; Horanský (SVK); L 0-2 (6-7, 1-6)	Did not advance		
Ons Jabeur	Girls' Singles	Erić (SRB); W 2-0 (7-6, 6-3)	Allertova (CZE); W 2-0 (6-4, 6-2)	Zheng (CHN); L 0-2 (6-7, 2-6)	Did not advance		

Doubles

Athlete	Event	Round 1	Quarterfinals	Semifinals	Final	Rank
Stefan Micov (MKD); Ahmed Triki (TUN)	Boys' Doubles	Fucsovics (HUN); Zsiga (HUN); L 0-2 (4-6, 2-6)	Did not advance			
Cristina Dinu (ROU); Ons Jabeur (TUN)	Girls' Doubles	Allertova (CZE); Radulovic (MNE); W 2-1 (7-5, 3-6, [10-1])	Tang (CHN); Zheng (CHN); L 0-2 (2-6, 3-6)	Did not advance		

== Weightlifting ==
Athlete	Event	Snatch	Clean & Jerk	Total	Rank
Karem Ben Hnia	Boys' 56kg	96	118	214	8
Oumaima Majti	Girls' 53kg	62	78	140	7

== Wrestling ==
Freestyle

Athlete	Event	Pools		Final	Rank
Athlete	Event	Groups	Rank	Final	Rank
Maher Ghanmi	Boys' 54kg	Takahashi (JPN); L T. Fall (0–6, 0–7)	4	7th Place Match; Leung (SIN); W T. Fall (7–0, 6–0)	7
Maher Ghanmi	Boys' 54kg	Mbambi (CGO); W 2–0 (5–2, 4–1)	4	7th Place Match; Leung (SIN); W T. Fall (7–0, 6–0)	7
Maher Ghanmi	Boys' 54kg	Daylak (TUR); L 0–2 (0–1, 0–8)	4	7th Place Match; Leung (SIN); W T. Fall (7–0, 6–0)	7
Maher Ghanmi	Boys' 54kg	Serrata (DOM); L 0–2 (0–2, 5–8)	4	7th Place Match; Leung (SIN); W T. Fall (7–0, 6–0)	7
Ikram Gannouni	Girls' 46kg	Holland (AUS); L Fall (3–0, 3–5)	4	7th Place Match; BYE	7
Ikram Gannouni	Girls' 46kg	Leorda (MDA); L Fall (1–7, 2–5)	4	7th Place Match; BYE	7
Ikram Gannouni	Girls' 46kg	Mertens (GER); L 0–2 (1–4, 0–6)	4	7th Place Match; BYE	7
