= San Marino at the 2010 Summer Youth Olympics =

- IOC code: SMR
- NOC: San Marino National Olympic Committee
- Website: www.cons.sm

in Singapore
- Competitors: 4 in 4 sports
- Flag bearer: Letizia Giardi
- Medals: Gold 0 Silver 0 Bronze 0 Total 0

Summer Youth Olympics appearances
- 2010; 2014; 2018

San Marino participated in the 2010 Summer Youth Olympics in Singapore.

The San Marino squad consisted of 4 athletes competing in 4 sports: judo, sailing, shooting and table tennis.

== Judo ==
Individual

Athlete	Event	Round 1	Round 2	Round 3	Semifinals	Final	Rank
Athlete	Event	Opposition Result	Opposition Result	Opposition Result	Opposition Result	Opposition Result	Rank
Paolo Persoglia	Boys' -66 kg	Ghazaryan (ARM); L 000-110	Repechage; Asl (IRI); L 000-101	Did not advance			17

Team

Team	Event	Round 1	Round 2	Semifinals	Final	Rank
Team	Event	Opposition Result	Opposition Result	Opposition Result	Opposition Result	Rank
Hamilton; Cynthia Rahming (BAH); Paolo Persoglia (SMR); Odette Giuffrida (ITA); Davit Ghazaryan (ARM); Wildjie Vertus (HAI); Jae Hyung Lee (KOR); Una Svetlana Tuba (SRB); Anis Shalabi (LBA)	Mixed Team	BYE	Cairo; L 4-4 (2-3)	Did not advance		5

== Sailing ==
One Person Dinghy

Athlete	Event	Race												Points	Rank
Athlete	Event	1	2	3	4	5	6	7	8	9	10	11	M*	Points	Rank
Matilde Simoncini	Girls' Byte CII	16	~~27~~	15	27	20	23	~~31~~	23	26	21	23	DNC	227	26

== Shooting ==
Pistol

Athlete	Event	Qualification		Final		
Athlete	Event	Score	Rank	Score	Total	Rank
Elia Andruccioli	Boys' 10m Air Pistol	554	16	Did not advance		

== Table tennis ==
Individual

Athlete	Event	Round 1		Round 2		Quarterfinals	Semifinals	Final	Rank
Athlete	Event	Group Matches	Rank	Group Matches	Rank	Quarterfinals	Semifinals	Final	Rank
Letizia Giardi	Girls' Singles	Eerland (NED); L 0-3 (3-11, 6-11, 2-11)	4 qB	Cordero (PUR); L 0-3 (7-11, 4-11, 9-11)	3	Did not advance			25
Letizia Giardi	Girls' Singles	Baravok (BLR); L 0-3 (5-11, 9-11, 5-11)	4 qB	Laid (ALG); W 3-0 (w/o)	3	Did not advance			25
Letizia Giardi	Girls' Singles	Szocs (ROU); L 0-3 (4-11, 5-11, 3-11)	4 qB	Loveridge (GBR); L 0-3 (6-11, 5-11, 8-11)	3	Did not advance			25

Team

Athlete	Event	Round 1		Round 2	Quarterfinals	Semifinals	Final	Rank
Athlete	Event	Group Matches	Rank	Round 2	Quarterfinals	Semifinals	Final	Rank
Intercontinental 4 Letizia Giardi (SMR); Patrick Massah (MAW)	Mixed Team	Hungary; Nagyvaradi (HUN); Lakatos (HUN); L 0-3 (0-3, 0-3, 0-3)	4 qB	Netherlands; Eerland (NED); Hageraats (NED); W 2-0 (w/o)	India; Bhandarkar (IND); Das (IND); L 0-2 (0-3, 0-3)	Did not advance		21
Intercontinental 4 Letizia Giardi (SMR); Patrick Massah (MAW)	Mixed Team	Europe 5 Baravok (BLR); Bajger (CZE); L 0-3 (1-3, 0-3, 0-3)	4 qB	Netherlands; Eerland (NED); Hageraats (NED); W 2-0 (w/o)	India; Bhandarkar (IND); Das (IND); L 0-2 (0-3, 0-3)	Did not advance		21
Intercontinental 4 Letizia Giardi (SMR); Patrick Massah (MAW)	Mixed Team	Korea; Yang (KOR); Kim (KOR); L 0-3 (0-3, 0-3, 0-3)	4 qB	Netherlands; Eerland (NED); Hageraats (NED); W 2-0 (w/o)	India; Bhandarkar (IND); Das (IND); L 0-2 (0-3, 0-3)	Did not advance		21
