= Swimming at the 2010 Summer Youth Olympics – Boys' 200 metre backstroke =

The men's 200 metre backstroke heats and semifinals at the 2010 Youth Olympic Games took place on August 20 at the Singapore Sports School.

== Medalists ==
Gold	Péter Bernek; Hungary	1:59.18
Silver	Yakov Toumarkin; Israel	1:59.39
Bronze	Balazs Zambo; Hungary	2:01.60

== Heats ==
=== Heat 1 ===
Rank	Lane	Name	Nationality	Time	Notes
1	4	Matuesz Wysoczynski	Poland	2:04.80	Q
2	2	Lavrans Solli	Norway	2:04.87	Q
3	5	Andrii Kovbasa	Ukraine	2:07.11	
4	3	Alexis Manacas da Silva Santos	Portugal	2:07.68	
5	7	Bastien Soret	Belgium	2:09.56	
6	1	Mark Sammut	Malta	2:16.85	
	6	Mans Hjelm	Sweden		DNS

=== Heat 2 ===
Rank	Lane	Name	Nationality	Time	Notes
1	5	Ivan Biondić	Croatia	2:03.67	Q
2	6	Balazs Zambo	Hungary	2:04.38	Q
3	4	Yusuke Yamagishi	Japan	2:05.32	Q
4	3	Christian Diener	Germany	2:05.44	
5	2	Chad Bobrosky	Canada	2:06.51	
6	7	Ondrej Palatka	Czech Republic	2:13.98	
7	1	Alan Wladimir Abarca Cortes	Chile	2:17.25	

=== Heat 3 ===
Rank	Lane	Name	Nationality	Time	Notes
1	4	Péter Bernek	Hungary	2:00.49	Q
2	5	Yakov Toumarkin	Israel	2:02.04	Q
3	3	Austin Ringquist	United States	2:05.36	Q
4	6	Rainer Kai Wee Ng	Singapore	2:06.84	
5	1	Chien-Lung Lin	Chinese Taipei	2:08.85	
6	7	Max Ackermann	Australia	2:09.18	
	2	Bilal Achalhi	Morocco		DSQ

== Final ==
Rank	Lane	Name	Nationality	Time	Notes
1st place, gold medalist(s)	4	Péter Bernek	Hungary	1:59.18	
2nd place, silver medalist(s)	5	Yakov Toumarkin	Israel	1:59.39	
3rd place, bronze medalist(s)	6	Balazs Zambo	Hungary	2:01.60	
4	3	Ivan Biondić	Croatia	2:03.40	
5	1	Yusuke Yamagishi	Japan	2:04.67	
6	7	Lavrans Solli	Norway	2:04.75	
7	8	Austin Ringquist	United States	2:04.85	
8	2	Matuesz Wysoczynski	Poland	2:05.01	
