= Malawi at the 2010 Summer Youth Olympics =

- IOC code: MAW
- NOC: Olympic and Commonwealth Games Association of Malawi

in Singapore
- Competitors: 3 in 3 sports
- Flag bearer: Patrick Massah
- Medals: Gold 0 Silver 0 Bronze 0 Total 0

Summer Youth Olympics appearances
- 2010; 2014; 2018

Malawi participated in the 2010 Summer Youth Olympics in Singapore.

The Malawi team consisted of 3 athletes in 3 sports: athletics, swimming and table tennis. It was the first Olympic competition in which the Malawian team competed under their new flag.

== Athletics ==
Note: The athletes who do not have a "Q" next to their Qualification Rank advance to a non-medal ranking final.

=== Boys ===
Track and road events

Athletes	Event	Qualification		Final	
Athletes	Event	Result	Rank	Result	Rank
Golden Gunde	Boys' 400m	48.68	10 qB	48.71	14

== Swimming ==
Athletes	Event	Heat		Semifinal		Final	
Athletes	Event	Time	Position	Time	Position	Time	Position
Zahra Pinto	Girls’ 50m Freestyle	31.08	50	Did not advance			

== Table tennis ==
Men's

Qualification

=== Group C ===
Team	Pld	W	L	PF	PA	PD	Pts
Tzu-Hsiang Hung (TPE)	3	3	0	9	0	+9	9
Zhe Yu Clarence Chew (SIN)	3	2	1	6	4	+2	6
Adem Hmam (TUN)	3	1	2	4	6	-2	3
Patrick Massah (MAW)	3	0	3	0	9	-9	0

21 August 2010
11:30

Patrick Massah (MAW)	0 – 3 (3-11, 2-11, 5-11)	Zhe Yu Clarence Chew (SIN)

21 August 2010
13:30

Patrick Massah (MAW)	0 – 3 (3-11, 3-11, 5-11)	Adem Hmam (TUN)

21 August 2010
15:30

Patrick Massah (MAW)	0 – 3 (6-11, 4-11, 6-11)	Tzu-Hsiang Hung (TPE)

Men's

Non-medal groups

=== Group HH ===
Team	Pld	W	L	PF	PA	PD	Pts
Omair Bedair (EGY)	3	3	0	9	3	+6	9
Leonardo Mutti (ITA)	3	2	1	7	3	+4	6
Hasintha Arsa Marakkala (SRI)	3	1	2	5	6	-1	3
Patrick Massah (MAW)	3	0	3	0	9	-9	0

21 August 2010
19:30

Patrick Massah (MAW)	0 – 3 (7-11, 2-11, 3-11)	Leonardo Mutti (ITA)

22 August 2010
11:30

Patrick Massah (MAW)	0 – 3 (3-11, 3-11, 5-11)	Hasintha Arsa Marakkala (SRI)

21 August 2010
13:30

Patrick Massah (MAW)	0 – 3 (2-11, 2-11, 3-11)	Omair Bedair (EGY)

Mixed teams

Athlete	Event	Match 1	Match 2	Match 3	Rank	Quarterfinal	Semifinal	Final	Rank
Intercontinental 4 Leticia Giardi (SMR); Patrick Massah (MAW)	Mixed Team	Hungary; Lakatos (HUN); Nagyvaradi (HUN)} L 0-3 (0-3, 0-3, 0-3)	Europe 5 Baravok (BLR); Bajger (CZE); L 0-3 (1-3, 0-3, 0-3)	Korea; Yang (KOR); Kim (KOR); L 0-3 (0-3, 0-3, 0-3)	4	Did not advance			

Non medal tournament

Athlete	Event	Round 1	Round 2	Quarterfinals	Semifinals	Final
Athlete	Event	Opposition Result	Opposition Result	Opposition Result	Opposition Result	Opposition Result
Intercontinental 4 Leticia Giardi (SMR); Patrick Massah (MAW)	Mixed Team	Netherlands; Eerland (NED); Hageraats (NED); W 2-0 (W/O)	India; Bhandarkar (IND); Das (IND); L 0-2 (0-3, 0-3)	Did not advance		
