= Paraguay at the 2010 Summer Youth Olympics =

- IOC code: PAR
- NOC: Comité Olímpico Paraguayo

in Singapore
- Competitors: 5 in 4 sports
- Flag bearer: Verónica Cepede Royg
- Medals: Gold 0 Silver 0 Bronze 0 Total 0

Summer Youth Olympics appearances
- 2010; 2014; 2018; 2026

Paraguay participated in the 2010 Summer Youth Olympics in Singapore.

== Athletics ==
=== Girls ===
Field Events

Athletes	Event	Qualification		Final	
Athletes	Event	Result	Rank	Result	Rank
Paola Miranda	Girls’ Hammer Throw	47.72	15 qB	DNS	

== Swimming ==
Athletes	Event	Heat		Semifinal		Final	
Athletes	Event	Time	Position	Time	Position	Time	Position
Maria Lopez Nery Huerta	Girls’ 50m Freestyle	27.98	29	Did not advance			
Maria Lopez Nery Huerta	Girls’ 200m Freestyle	2:11.60	35			Did not advance	

== Table tennis ==
Individual

Athlete	Event	Round 1		Round 2		Quarterfinals	Semifinals	Final	Rank
Athlete	Event	Group Matches	Rank	Group Matches	Rank	Quarterfinals	Semifinals	Final	Rank
Axel Gavilan	Boys' singles	Soderlund (SWE); L 2–3 (12–14, 11–9, 2–11 11–9, 6–11)	3 qB	Das (IND); W 3–2 (11–7, 13–15, 11–5, 7–11, 11–8)	1	Did not advance			17
Axel Gavilan	Boys' singles	Kam (MRI); W 3–2 (11–9, 15–13, 11–13, 9–11, 11–4)	3 qB	Mejía (ESA); W 3–0 (14–12, 11–6, 11–9)	1	Did not advance			17
Axel Gavilan	Boys' singles	Fucec (CRO); L 2–3 (14–12, 3–11, 9–11, 11–9, 10–12)	3 qB	Holikov (UZB); W 3–0 (11–8, 11–8, 11–9)	1	Did not advance			17

Team

Athlete	Event	Round 1		Round 2	Quarterfinals	Semifinals	Final	Rank
Athlete	Event	Group Matches	Rank	Round 2	Quarterfinals	Semifinals	Final	Rank
Pan America 1 Ariel Hsing (USA); Axel Gavilan (PAR)	Mixed team	BYE	3 qB	Africa 1 Laid (ALG); Onaolapo (NGR); W 2–0 (w/o)	Europe 6 Galic (SLO); Leitgeb (AUT); L 0–2 (2–3, 1–3)	Did not advance		21
Pan America 1 Ariel Hsing (USA); Axel Gavilan (PAR)	Mixed team	Japan; Tanioka (JPN); Niwa (JPN); L 0–3 (2–3, 0–3, 0–3)	3 qB	Africa 1 Laid (ALG); Onaolapo (NGR); W 2–0 (w/o)	Europe 6 Galic (SLO); Leitgeb (AUT); L 0–2 (2–3, 1–3)	Did not advance		21
Pan America 1 Ariel Hsing (USA); Axel Gavilan (PAR)	Mixed team	Brazil; Kumahara (BRA); Jouti (BRA); L 1–2 (1–3, 3–1, 2–3)	3 qB	Africa 1 Laid (ALG); Onaolapo (NGR); W 2–0 (w/o)	Europe 6 Galic (SLO); Leitgeb (AUT); L 0–2 (2–3, 1–3)	Did not advance		21

== Tennis ==
Singles

Athlete	Event	Round 1	Round 2	Quarterfinals	Semifinals	Final	Rank
Diego Galeano	Boys' Singles	Colella (ITA); L 1–2 (7–5, 2–6, 3–6)	Consolation; Horanský (SVK); L 1–2 (6–4, 4–6, [3–10])	Did not advance			
Verónica Cepede Royg	Girls' Singles	Dinu (ROU); L 0–2 (5–7, 3–6)	Consolation; Mutaguchi (JPN); L 0–2 (1–6, 4–6)	Did not advance			

Doubles

Athlete	Event	Round 1	Quarterfinals	Semifinals	Final	Rank
Diego Galeano (PAR); Ricardo Rodriguez (VEN)	Boys' Doubles	Huang (TPE); Uchiyama (JPN); W 2–0 (6–4, 6–4)	Fernendes (BRA); Olivo (ARG); W 2–0 (6–4, 6–4)	Golding (GBR); Vesely (CZE); L 0–2 (3–6, 2–6)	Bronze medal match Horanský (SVK); Kovalík (SVK); L 0–2 (5–7, 4–6)	4
Verónica Cepede Royg (PAR); Augustina Sol Eskenazi (ARG)	Girls' doubles	Kovalets (UKR); Svitolina (UKR); L 1–2 (2–6, 6–4, [5–10])	Did not advance			
