= Mauritius at the 2010 Summer Youth Olympics =

- IOC code: MRI
- NOC: Mauritius Olympic Committee

in Singapore
- Competitors: 9 in 5 sports
- Flag bearer: Marty Loic Darren Paul
- Medals: Gold 0 Silver 0 Bronze 0 Total 0

Summer Youth Olympics appearances
- 2010; 2014; 2018

Mauritius participated in the 2010 Summer Youth Olympics in Singapore.

The Mauritius team consisted of 9 athletes competing in 5 sports: athletics, badminton, judo, swimming and table tennis.

== Medalists ==
Medal	Name	Sport	Event	Date
Bronze	Gaelle Nemori	Judo	Mixed Team	25 Aug

== Athletics ==
=== Boys ===
Track and Road Events

Athletes	Event	Qualification		Final	
Athletes	Event	Result	Rank	Result	Rank
Louis Fabrice Rajah	Boys’ 110m Hurdles	14.66	14 qC	14.40	15

Field Events

Athletes	Event	Qualification		Final	
Athletes	Event	Result	Rank	Result	Rank
Marty Loic Darren Paul	Boys’ Triple Jump	15.06	7 Q	14.89	7
B. Alison Ignace Nursimloo	Boys’ High Jump	1.90	14 qB	1.94	13
Abel Thesee	Boys’ Pole Vault	NM qB		NM	

== Badminton ==
Girls

Athlete	Event	Group Stage				Knock-Out Stage			
Athlete	Event	Match 1	Match 2	Match 3	Rank	Quarterfinal	Semifinal	Final	Rank
Kate Foo Kune	Girls’ Singles	Wong (CAN) L 0-2 (17-21, 19-21)	Matsutomo (JPN) L 0-2 (4-21, 2-21)	Wentholt (NED) L 0-2 (7-21, 12-21)	4	Did not advance			

== Judo ==
Individual

Athlete	Event	Round 1	Round 2	Round 3	Semifinals	Final	Rank
Athlete	Event	Opposition Result	Opposition Result	Opposition Result	Opposition Result	Opposition Result	Rank
Gaelle Nemorin	Girls' -63 kg	Shor (ISR); L 000-020	Repechage; Vertus (HAI); W 010-001	Repechage; Bacaj (ALB); W 101-000	Repechage; Shor (ISR); L 000-100	Did not advance	9

Team

Team	Event	Round 1	Round 2	Semifinals	Final	Rank
Team	Event	Opposition Result	Opposition Result	Opposition Result	Opposition Result	Rank
Tokyo; Seul Bi Bae (KOR); Fabio Basile (ITA); Gaelle Nemorin (MRI); Patrik Ferreira Martins (AND); Rotem Shor (ISR); Kevin Fernandez (HON); Kseniya Darchuk (UKR); Batuhan Efemgil (TUR)	Mixed Team	Paris; W 5-3	New York; W 4-4 (3-2)	Belgrade; L 3-5	Did not advance	Bronze medal

== Swimming ==
Athletes	Event	Heat		Semifinal		Final	
Athletes	Event	Time	Position	Time	Position	Time	Position
Jean Marie Froget	Boys’ 200m Freestyle	2:02.98	41			Did not advance	
Adeline Mei-Li Tin Hon Ko	Girls’ 200m Freestyle	2:21.73	39			Did not advance	

== Table tennis ==
Individual

Athlete	Event	Round 1		Round 2		Quarterfinals	Semifinals	Final	Rank
Athlete	Event	Group Matches	Rank	Group Matches	Rank	Quarterfinals	Semifinals	Final	Rank
Wa Warren Li Kam	Boys' Singles	Fucec (CRO); L 0-3 (6-11, 7-11, 10-12)	4 qB	Wu (NZL); L 2-3 (11-6, 4-11, 11-8, 4-11, 7-11)	4	Did not advance			29
Wa Warren Li Kam	Boys' Singles	Gavilan (PAR); L 2-3 (9-11, 13-15, 13-11, 11-9, 4-11)	4 qB	Wagner (GER); L 1-3 (8-11, 11-9, 11-13, 7-11)	4	Did not advance			29
Wa Warren Li Kam	Boys' Singles	Soderlund (SWE); L 0-3 (6-11, 9-11, 5-11)	4 qB	Santiwattanatarm (THA); L 0-3 (7-11, 2-11, 10-12)	4	Did not advance			29

Team

Athlete	Event	Round 1		Round 2	Quarterfinals	Semifinals	Final	Rank
Athlete	Event	Group Matches	Rank	Round 2	Quarterfinals	Semifinals	Final	Rank
Africa 2 Jolie Mafuta Ivoso (CGO); Wa Warren Li Kam (MRI)	Mixed Team	Europe 3 Loveridge (GBR); Mutti (ITA); L 0-3 (0-3, 0-3, 1-3)	4 qB	Intercontinental 2 Noskova (RUS); Holikov (UZB); L 0-2 (0-3, 0-3)	Did not advance			25
Africa 2 Jolie Mafuta Ivoso (CGO); Wa Warren Li Kam (MRI)	Mixed Team	Europe 4 Bliznet (MDA); Kulpa (POL); L 0-3 (0-3, 0-3, 0-3)	4 qB	Intercontinental 2 Noskova (RUS); Holikov (UZB); L 0-2 (0-3, 0-3)	Did not advance			25
Africa 2 Jolie Mafuta Ivoso (CGO); Wa Warren Li Kam (MRI)	Mixed Team	Europe 1 Szocs (ROU); Soderlund (SWE); L 0-3 (0-3, 1-3, 0-3)	4 qB	Intercontinental 2 Noskova (RUS); Holikov (UZB); L 0-2 (0-3, 0-3)	Did not advance			25
