= Sweden at the 2010 Summer Youth Olympics =

- IOC code: SWE
- NOC: Swedish Olympic Committee
- Website: www.sok.se (in Swedish and English)

in Singapore
- Competitors: 15 in 8 sports
- Flag bearer: Angelica Bengtsson
- Medals Ranked 28th: Gold 2 Silver 0 Bronze 3 Total 5

Summer Youth Olympics appearances (overview)
- 2010; 2014; 2018; 2026

Sweden participated at the 2010 Summer Youth Olympics in Singapore. The nation won a total of five medals, including two gold medals.

== Medalists ==
Medal	Name	Sport	Event	Date
Gold	Angelica Bengtsson	Athletics	Girls' Pole Vault	21 Aug
Gold	Khadijatou Sagnia	Athletics	Girls' Triple Jump	23 Aug
Bronze	Jennifer Ågren	Taekwondo	Girls' 55kg	17 Aug
Bronze	Heidi Schmidt	Athletics	Girls' Discus	21 Aug
Bronze	Jonna Adlerteg	Gymnastics	Women's Uneven Bars	21 Aug

== Athletics ==
=== Boys ===
Field Events

Athletes	Event	Qualification		Final	
Athletes	Event	Result	Rank	Result	Rank
Oscar Vestlund	Boys’ Shot Put	17.68	14 qB	18.93	9
Melker Svard Jacobsson	Boys’ Pole Vault	4.70	2 Q	4.85	4

=== Girls ===
Field Events

Athletes	Event	Qualification		Final	
Athletes	Event	Result	Rank	Result	Rank
Heidi Schmidt	Girls’ Discus Throw	47.20	3 Q	47.57	Bronze medal
Khadijatou Sagnia	Girls’ Triple Jump	13.21	1 Q	13.56	Gold medal
Angelica Bengtsson	Girls’ Pole Vault	3.90	2 Q	4.30	Gold medal

== Badminton ==
Boys

Athlete	Event	Group Stage				Knock-Out Stage			
Athlete	Event	Match 1	Match 2	Match 3	Rank	Quarterfinal	Semifinal	Final	Rank
Mikael Westerback	Boys’ Singles	Quach (DEN) L 0–2 (20–22, 9–21)	Qaddoum (JOR) W 2–0 (21–4, 21–9)	Poodchalat (THA) L 0–2 (13–21, 11–21)	3	Did not advance			

== Gymnastics ==
=== Artistic Gymnastics ===
Girls

Athlete	Event	Vault		Uneven Bars		Beam		Floor		Total	
Athlete	Event	Score	Rank	Score	Rank	Score	Rank	Score	Rank	Score	Rank
Jonna Adlerteg	Girls' Qualification	13.400	18	13.350	7 Q	13.600	8 Q	13.250	5 Q	53.600	9 Q
Jonna Adlerteg	Girls' Individual All-Around	13.650	9	13.250	5	12.550	14	13.150	10	52.600	10

Athlete	Event	Score	Rank
Jonna Adlerteg	Girls' Uneven Bars	13.550	Bronze medal
Jonna Adlerteg	Girls' Beam	11.825	8
Jonna Adlerteg	Girls' Floor	13.275	7

== Rowing ==
Athlete	Event	Heats		Repechage		Semifinals		Final		Overall Rank
Athlete	Event	Time	Rank	Time	Rank	Time	Rank	Time	Rank	Overall Rank
Ebba Sundberg	Girls' Single Sculls	4:01.24	4 QR	4:15.77	4 QC/D	4:15.63	2 QC	3:17.39	6	17

== Swimming ==
Athletes	Event	Heat		Semifinal		Final	
Athletes	Event	Time	Position	Time	Position	Time	Position
Måns Hjelm	Boys’ 50m Freestyle	24.01	18	Did not advance			
Måns Hjelm	Boys’ 100m Freestyle	53.31	25	Did not advance			
Måns Hjelm	Boys’ 50m Backstroke			27.23	9	Did not advance	
Måns Hjelm	Boys’ 100m Backstroke	59.08	20	Did not advance			
Måns Hjelm	Boys’ 200m Backstroke	DNS				Did not advance	
Måns Hjelm	Boys’ 200m Individual Medley	2:09.81	21			Did not advance	
Gustav Åberg Lejdström	Boys’ 200m Freestyle	1:54.25	20			Did not advance	
Gustav Åberg Lejdström	Boys’ 400m Freestyle	4:01.03	10			Did not advance	
Lovisa Eriksson	Girls’ 50m Freestyle	26.41	6 Q	26.32	8 Q	25.96	5
Lovisa Eriksson	Girls’ 50m Backstroke	29.71	3 Q	29.82	4 Q	Withdrew	
Lovisa Eriksson	Girls’ 100m Backstroke	1:04.10	4 Q	1:03.48	4 Q	1:03.40	5
Lovisa Eriksson	Girls’ 50m Butterfly	27.44	2 Q	27.27	3 Q	27.55	6
Lovisa Eriksson	Girls’ 100m Butterfly	1:01.24	5 Q	Withdrew		Did not advance	
Ida Lindborg	Girls’ 100m Backstroke	1:04.17	5 Q	1:03.99	6 Q	1:03.60	6
Ida Lindborg	Girls’ 200m Backstroke	2:21.26	20			Did not advance	

== Table tennis ==
Individual

Athlete	Event	Round 1		Round 2		Quarterfinals	Semifinals	Final	Rank
Athlete	Event	Group Matches	Rank	Group Matches	Rank	Quarterfinals	Semifinals	Final	Rank
Hampus Soderlund	Boys' Singles	Gavilan (PAR); W 3–2 (14–12, 9–11, 11–2, 9–11, 11–6)	1 Q	Chew (SIN); L 1–3 (11–9, 6–11, 9–11, 8–11)	1 Q	Lakatos (HUN); L 2–4 (7–11, 3–11, 11–4, 8–11, 11–1, 4–11)	Did not advance		5
Hampus Soderlund	Boys' Singles	Fucec (CRO); W 3–0 (13–11, 11–7, 11–6)	1 Q	Onaolapo (NGR); W 3–0 (11–6, 11–7, 11–4)	1 Q	Lakatos (HUN); L 2–4 (7–11, 3–11, 11–4, 8–11, 11–1, 4–11)	Did not advance		5
Hampus Soderlund	Boys' Singles	Kam (MRI); W 3–0 (11–6, 11–9, 11–5)	1 Q	Leitgeb (AUT); W 3–0 (11–7, 11–7, 11–7)	1 Q	Lakatos (HUN); L 2–4 (7–11, 3–11, 11–4, 8–11, 11–1, 4–11)	Did not advance		5

Team

Athlete	Event	Round 1		Round 2	Quarterfinals	Semifinals	Final	Rank
Athlete	Event	Group Matches	Rank	Round 2	Quarterfinals	Semifinals	Final	Rank
Europe 1 Bernadette Szocs (ROU); Hampus Soderlund (SWE)	Mixed Team	Europe 4 Bliznet (MDA); Kulpa (POL); W 2–1 (3–0, 1–3, 3–1)	1 Q	Brazil; Kumahara (BRA); Jouti (BRA); W 2–0 (3–1, 3–1)	DPR Korea; Kim (PRK); Kim (PRK); L 1–2 (2–3, 3–0, 2–3)	Did not advance		5
Europe 1 Bernadette Szocs (ROU); Hampus Soderlund (SWE)	Mixed Team	Europe 3 Loveridge (GBR); Mutti (ITA); W 2–1 (3–0, 2–3, 3–1)	1 Q	Brazil; Kumahara (BRA); Jouti (BRA); W 2–0 (3–1, 3–1)	DPR Korea; Kim (PRK); Kim (PRK); L 1–2 (2–3, 3–0, 2–3)	Did not advance		5
Europe 1 Bernadette Szocs (ROU); Hampus Soderlund (SWE)	Mixed Team	Africa 2 Ivoso (CGO); Kam (MRI); W 3–0 (3–0, 3–1, 3–0)	1 Q	Brazil; Kumahara (BRA); Jouti (BRA); W 2–0 (3–1, 3–1)	DPR Korea; Kim (PRK); Kim (PRK); L 1–2 (2–3, 3–0, 2–3)	Did not advance		5

== Taekwondo ==
Athlete	Event	Preliminary	Quarterfinal	Semifinal	Final	Rank
Jennifer Agren	Girls' −55kg	BYE	Ndeye Coumba Diop (SEN); W DSQ	Jade Jones (GBR); L 0–4	Did not advance	Bronze medal

== Triathlon ==
Girls

Triathlete	Event	Swimming	Transit 1	Cycling	Transit 2	Running	Total time	Rank
Annie Thoren	Individual	9:31	0:35	32:10	0:27	21:52	1:04:35.16	15

Mixed

Athlete	Event	Total Times per Athlete (Swim 250 m, Bike 7 km, Run 1.7 km)	Total Group Time	Rank
Annie Thoren (SWE); Thomas Jurgens (BEL); Elinor Thorogood (GBR); Andrew Hood (GBR)	Mixed Team Relay; Europe 4	21:11; 19:08; 22:04; 20:31	1:22:54.12	7
