= Yu Wai Ting =

Hong Kong swimmer

YU Wai Ting
Personal information
- Full name: Yu Wai Ting Janet
- Nickname: Janet
- Nationality: Hong Kong
- Born: August 1, 1993 (age 33) Hong Kong
- Height: 1.76 m (5 ft 9 in)
- Weight: 54 kg (119 lb)

Sport
- Sport: Swimming
- Strokes: Freestyle
Medal record
Representing Hong Kong
Asian Games
Bronze medal – third place	2010 Guangzhou	4x100m freestyle relay

Yu Wai Ting (Chinese: 于蕙婷; Jyutping: jyu^{1} wai^{6} ting^{4}; born August 1, 1993) is a freestyle swimmer from Hong Kong. At the 2010 Asian Games, she was part of Hong Kong's bronze-medal winning 400 Free Relay.

She has swum for Hong Kong at:

- Asian Games: 2010
- Asian Indoor Games: 2009
- Asian Swimming Championships: 2009
- Youth Olympics: 2010
