= Julia Wu (table tennis) =

New Zealand table tennis player

Julia Wu is a right-handed table tennis player from New Zealand who has represented New Zealand and Oceania in a number of international championships, including the 2010 Summer Youth Olympics held in Singapore and the 2015 Summer Universiade in Gwangju. She plays with a shakehand grip. In the 2009 ASB Young Sports Person of the Year Awards, Wu was a finalist in the Girls Table Tennis section.

== Sporting career ==
Wu was professionally trained in Auckland, where she was part of the high performance programme within the Auckland Table Tennis Association.

When asked about representing New Zealand, she replied: "It means a lot – I would've never thought that I would have made it but I did, so I am extremely happy to be part of the team."

=== Competitions ===
- 2008 Oceania Table Tennis Championships
- 2008 Tahiti Junior Open
- 2008 New Zealand Summer Nationals
  - U15 Girls' Singles – 1st
  - U15 Girls' Doubles – 1st (with Angie Guo)
  - U15 Mixed Doubles – 2nd (with Brad Storer)
- 2008 World Junior Table Tennis Championships
- 2009 ITTF Cadet Challenge & ITTF Junior Circuit Finals
- 2010 Oceania Youth Olympic Games Qualification Event
- 2010 Oceania Table Tennis Championships
  - Individual Events
    - U21 Women's Doubles – 3rd
    - U18 Girls' Singles – 3rd
    - U18 Girls' Doubles – 3rd (with Jennifer Tseng; tied with Natalie Paterson/Sophia Dong)
  - Team Events
    - U18 Girls' Team – 2nd (with Jennifer Tseng and Natalie Paterson)
- 2010 Youth Olympic Games
  - Played Women's Singles and Mixed Team
- 2010 New Zealand Junior & Cadet Open – ITTF Junior Circuit
  - Cadet Girls' Doubles – 1st (with Angie Guo)
- 2015 Summer Universiade
  - Played Women's Singles, Women's Doubles, Women's Team, and Mixed Doubles

== Personal life ==
Wu is an avid guitar and bass player.

== See also ==
- Kevin Wu
- Table tennis at the 2010 Summer Youth Olympics
