= Adam Hmam =

Tunisian table tennis player

Personal information
- Native name: آدم حمام
- Born: 11 November 1994 (age 31) Tunis

Sport
- Sport: Table tennis
- Club: Tunisian Federation of Sports, Gabès
Medal record
Table tennis
Representing (International Olympic Committee) Mixed-NOCs
Youth Olympic Games
Bronze medal – third place	2010 Singapore	Mixed team

Adam Hmam (Arabic: آدم حمام) (born 11 November 1994) is a Tunisian table tennis player, and is the highest ranked player in Tunisia. He won a bronze medal in the Mixed team event at the 2010 Summer Youth Olympics with the Chinese Gu Yuting.

== Career ==
After winning the African Youth Championship in 2011, Adam Hmam joined the French national team 1 of table tennis in Montpellier.

In 2013, Hmam again won the African Youth Championship.

He qualified for the 2020 Summer Olympics in Tokyo.
