= Carelyn Cordero =

Puerto Rican table tennis player

Personal information
- Born: 1 February 1994 (age 32) Jayuya, Puerto Rico
Medal record
Women's table tennis
Representing Puerto Rico
Pan American Games
| Bronze medal – third place | 2015 Toronto | Team |

Carelyn Cordero (born February 1, 1994) is table tennis player for Puerto Rico who has achieved international recognition for her performance.

== Record ==
Cordero was number one in the girls competition in Rekordspelen 2011 and played in women's singles at the Guadalajara 2011 Pan American Games. She was first in the teams competition at the 2014 Central American and Caribbean Games, and first in the girls doubles at 2014 Latin American youth championships. She earned the bronze medal in the teams at the 2015 Toronto Pan American Games.

== See also ==
- List of Puerto Ricans
- Sports in Puerto Rico
