= Czech Republic at the 2010 Summer Youth Olympics =

- IOC code: CZE
- NOC: Czech Olympic Committee
- Website: www.olympic.cz

in Singapore
- Competitors: 38 in 16 sports
- Flag bearer: Jaromír Mazgal
- Medals Ranked 36th: Gold 1 Silver 2 Bronze 3 Total 6

Summer Youth Olympics appearances (overview)
- 2010; 2014; 2018

Czech Republic participated in the 2010 Summer Youth Olympics in Singapore. It won six individual medals and one gold more in the mixed team event.

== Medalists ==
Medal	Name	Sport	Event	Date
Gold	David Pulkrábek	Judo	Boys' 55 kg	20 Aug
Gold	Jiří Veselý	Tennis	Boys' Doubles	20 Aug
Silver	Gabriela Vognarová	Shooting	10m Air Rifle Women Junior	25 Aug
Silver	Pavlína Zástěrová	Canoeing	K1 Obstacle Canoe Slalom Women	25 Aug
Bronze	Barbora Závadová	Swimming	Girls' 200m Medley	16 Aug
Bronze	Jaromír Mazgal	Athletics	Boys' Discus throw	21 Aug
Bronze	Jiří Prskavec	Canoeing	K1 Obstacle Canoe Slalom Men	25 Aug

== Archery ==
Boys

Athlete	Event	Ranking Round		Round of 32	Round of 16	Quarterfinals	Semifinals	Final	
Athlete	Event	Score	Seed	Opposition Score	Opposition Score	Opposition Score	Opposition Score	Opposition Score	Rank
František Hajduk	Boys’ Individual	603	20	Ku (TPE); W 6–4	Tsybzhitov (RUS); L 0–6	Did not advance			9

Mixed Team

Athlete	Event	Partner	Round of 32	Round of 16	Quarterfinals	Semifinals	Final	
Athlete	Event	Partner	Opposition Score	Opposition Score	Opposition Score	Opposition Score	Opposition Score	Rank
František Hajduk	Mixed Team	Zoe Gobbels (BEL)	Hul (BLR)/ Luo (CHN); L 2–6	Did not advance				17

== Athletics ==
=== Boys ===
Track and Road Events

Athletes	Event	Qualification		Final	
Athletes	Event	Result	Rank	Result	Rank
Zdeněk Stromšík	Boys’ 100m	11.52	22 qC	11.45	18
Václav Sedlák	Boys’ 110m Hurdles	13.92	8 Q	13.87	7

Field Events

Athletes	Event	Qualification		Final	
Athletes	Event	Result	Rank	Result	Rank
Jaromír Mazgal	Boys’ Discus Throw	58.93	3 Q	60.31	Bronze medal
Jaromír Pumr	Boys’ Hammer Throw	NM qB		63.78	13
Ondřej Honka	Boys’ Pole Vault	4.60	10 qB	4.30	12

=== Girls ===
Track and Road Events

Athletes	Event	Qualification		Final	
Athletes	Event	Result	Rank	Result	Rank
Jana Sotáková	Girls’ 100m Hurdles	13.98	8 Q	13.99	8
Nikola Řehounková	Girls’ 400m Hurdles	1:02.81	10 qB	1:01.35	10

== Basketball ==
Girls

Squad List	Event	Group Stage		Placement Stage			Rank
Squad List	Event	Group C	Rank	9th–16th	13th–16th	13th–14th	Rank
Michaela Vojtková; Gabriela Mervínská (C); Radka Brhelová; Michaela Vacková	Girls' Basketball	Mali; W 33–8	3	France; L 24–29	Angola; W 18–15	Mali; W 32–12	13
Michaela Vojtková; Gabriela Mervínská (C); Radka Brhelová; Michaela Vacková	Girls' Basketball	Brazil; L 26–30	3	France; L 24–29	Angola; W 18–15	Mali; W 32–12	13
Michaela Vojtková; Gabriela Mervínská (C); Radka Brhelová; Michaela Vacková	Girls' Basketball	Thailand; W 28–26	3	France; L 24–29	Angola; W 18–15	Mali; W 32–12	13
Michaela Vojtková; Gabriela Mervínská (C); Radka Brhelová; Michaela Vacková	Girls' Basketball	China; L 19–33	3	France; L 24–29	Angola; W 18–15	Mali; W 32–12	13

== Boxing ==
Boys

Athlete	Event	Preliminaries	Semifinals	Final	Rank
Jakub Chval	Featherweight (57kg)	Fradimil Macayo (VEN); L 2–15	Did not advance	5th Place Bout; Anand Dashdorj (MGL); L 6–12	6

== Canoeing ==
Boys

Athlete	Event	Time Trial		Round 1	Round 2 (Rep)	Round 3	Round 4	Round 5	Final	Rank
Athlete	Event	Time	Rank	Round 1	Round 2 (Rep)	Round 3	Round 4	Round 5	Final	Rank
Jiří Prskavec	Boys’ K1 Slalom	1:29.76	4	Liebscher (GER); W 1:29.69-1:40.32		Jimenez (CUB); W 1:29.58-1:49.73	Zelnychenko (UKR); W 1:29.19-1:39.04	Brus (SLO); L 1:27.62-1:25.44	Bernis (FRA); W 1:28.23-1:29.02	Bronze medal
Jiří Prskavec	Boys’ K1 Sprint	1:50.95	20	Sutkus (LTU); L 1:51.29-1:33.10	Bernis (FRA); L 1:52.09-1:37.58	Did not advance				

Girls

Athlete	Event	Time Trial		Round 1	Round 2 (Rep)	Round 3	Round 4	Round 5	Final	Rank
Athlete	Event	Time	Rank	Round 1	Round 2 (Rep)	Round 3	Round 4	Round 5	Final	Rank
Pavlína Zástěrová	Girls’ K1 Slalom	1:39.39	4	Rimi (MAR); W 1:38.05-2:09.79		Pedroso (POR); W 1:39.88-1:54.18	Denhollander (CAN); W 1:37.31-1:43.05	Wolffhardt (AUT); W 1:37.02-1:38.23	Fox (AUS); L 1:40.79-1:33.64	Silver medal
Pavlína Zástěrová	Girls’ K1 Sprint	2:02.12	18	Huang (CHN); L 2:00.73-1:42.66	Wang (SIN); L 2:00.02-1:49.20	Did not advance				

== Cycling ==
Cross Country

Athlete	Event	Time	Rank	Points
Daniel Veselý	Boys’ Cross Country	1:02:16	9	50
Karolína Kalašová	Girls’ Cross Country	46:58	1	1

Time Trial

Athlete	Event	Time	Rank	Points
Matěj Lasák	Boys’ Time Trial	4:17.74	17	30
Karolína Kalašová	Girls’ Time Trial	3:23.87	2	5

BMX

Athlete	Event	Seeding Round		Quarterfinals							Semifinals							Final		
Athlete	Event	Seeding Round		Run 1		Run 2		Run 3		Rank	Run 1		Run 2		Run 3		Rank	Final		
Athlete	Event	Time	Rank	Time	Rank	Time	Rank	Time	Rank	Rank	Time	Rank	Time	Rank	Time	Rank	Rank	Time	Rank	Points
Jakub Hladík	Boys’ BMX	32.854	10	46.707	4	33.205	3	34.832	5	4 Q	33.314	6	42.267	5	36.835	4	5	Did not advance		50
Karolína Kalašová	Girls’ BMX	56.064	27	46.427	6	1:10.227	8	50.203	7	7	Did not advance									40

Road Race

Athlete	Event	Time	Rank	Points
Daniel Veselý	Boys’ Road Race	1:05:44	35	67*
Matěj Lasák	Boys’ Road Race	1:11:39	52	
Jakub Hladík	Boys’ Road Race	1:16:48	72	

Overall

Team	Event	Cross Country Pts		Time Trial Pts		BMX Pts		Road Race Pts	Total	Rank
Team	Event	Boys	Girls	Boys	Girls	Boys	Girls	Road Race Pts	Total	Rank
Karolína Kalašová; Daniel Veselý; Matěj Lasák; Jakub Hladík	Mixed Team	50	1	30	5	50	40	67*	243	8

- * Received −5 for finishing road race with all three racers

== Fencing ==
Group Stage

Athlete	Event	Match 1	Match 2	Match 3	Match 4	Match 5	Match 6	Seed
Ondřej Novotný	Boys’ Épée	Godoy (CRC); W 5–4	Lyssov (CAN); W 5–4	Lim (SIN); W 4–3	Bodoczi (GER); L 1–5	Ciovica (ROU); W 5–3	Na (KOR); L 3–5	5
Alexander Choupenitch	Boys’ Foil	Massialas (USA); L 1–5	Choi (HKG); L 0–5	Tsoronis (DEN); W 5–3	Babaoglu (TUR); L 3–5	Rosabal (CUB); W 5–2	Ong (SIN); W 5–1	7

Knock-Out Stage

Athlete	Event	Round of 16	Quarterfinals	Semifinals	Final	Rank
Ondřej Novotný	Boys’ Épée	Lim (SIN); L 11–15	Did not advance			9
Alexander Choupenitch	Boys’ Foil	Rosabal (CUB); W 15–6	Luperi (ITA); L 7–15	Did not advance		6
Europe 4 Kenza Boudad (FRA); Lucian Ciovica (ROU); Michala Cellerova (SVK); Arthur Zatko (FRA); Amalia Tătăran (ROU); Alexander Choupenitch (CZE)	Mixed Team		Asia-Oceania 1 L 24–30	5th–8th Asia-Oceania 2 W 30–20	5th–6th Europe 3 W 30–29	5

== Gymnastics ==
=== Artistic Gymnastics ===
Girls

Athlete	Event	Vault		Uneven Bars		Beam		Floor		Total	
Athlete	Event	Score	Rank	Score	Rank	Score	Rank	Score	Rank	Score	Rank
Petra Hedbávná	Girls' Qualification	12.250	38	11.600	24	12.100	32	11.600	32	47.550	30

== Judo ==
Individual

Athlete	Event	Round 1	Round 2	Round 3	Semifinals	Final	Rank
Athlete	Event	Opposition Result	Opposition Result	Opposition Result	Opposition Result	Opposition Result	Rank
David Pulkrábek	Boys' −55 kg	Basile (ITA); W 100–000	Atanov (UKR); W 020–001		Rivadulla (ESP); W 011–001	Muminkhujaev (UZB); W 010–001	Gold medal

== Modern pentathlon ==
Athlete	Event	Fencing (Épée One Touch)			Swimming (200m Freestyle)			Running & Shooting (3000m, Laser Pistol)			Total Points	Final Rank
Athlete	Event	Results	Rank	Points	Time	Rank	Points	Time	Rank	Points	Total Points	Final Rank
Martin Bilko	Boys' Individual	6–17	23	600	2:12.40	14	1212	12:24.60	20	2024	3836	23
Alice Lencová	Girls' Individual	17–6	1	1040	2:28.99	20	1016	14:44.43	22	1464	3520	16
Gintare Venckauskaite (LTU); Martin Bilko (CZE)	Mixed Relay	40–52	18	760	2:05.10	12	1300	15:28.38	5	2368	4428	9
Alice Lencová (CZE); Greg Longden (GBR)	Mixed Relay	39–53	19	750	2:04.66	10	1304	17:19.72	23	1924	3978	23

== Rowing ==
Athlete	Event	Heats		Repechage		Semifinals		Final		Overall Rank
Athlete	Event	Time	Rank	Time	Rank	Time	Rank	Time	Rank	Overall Rank
Martin Slavík	Boys' Single Sculls	3:34.09	4 QR	3:32.92	3 QC/D	3:45.13	3 QC	3:36.91	4	15
Kristýna Fleissnerová	Girls' Single Sculls	3:39.37	1 QA/B			3:55.02	4 QB	3:53.38	3	9

== Shooting ==
Pistol

Athlete	Event	Qualification		Final		
Athlete	Event	Score	Rank	Score	Total	Rank
Jindřich Dubový	Boys' 10m Air Pistol	571	5 Q	98.8	669.8	6
Šáka Jonáková	Girls' 10m Air Pistol	370	11	Did not advance		

Rifle

Athlete	Event	Qualification		Final		
Athlete	Event	Score	Rank	Score	Total	Rank
Petr Plecháč	Boys' 10m Air Rifle	584	13	Did not advance		
Gabriela Vognarová	Girls' 10m Air Rifle	397	3 Q	101.6	498.6	Silver medal

== Swimming ==
Athletes	Event	Heat		Semifinal		Final	
Athletes	Event	Time	Position	Time	Position	Time	Position
Ondřej Palatka	Boys' 100m Backstroke	58.86	17 Q*	58.17	16	Did not advance	
Ondřej Palatka	Boys' 200m Backstroke	2:13.98	17			Did not advance	
Ondřej Palatka	Boys' 100m Butterfly	57.41	23	Did not advance			
Barbora Závadová	Girls' 200m Backstroke	2:14.64	2 Q			2:14.16	5
Barbora Závadová	Girls' 200m Butterfly	2:18.55	14			Did not advance	
Barbora Závadová	Girls' 200m Individual Medley	2:17.74	5 Q			2:15.36	Bronze medal
Martina Elhenická	Girls' 100m Backstroke	1:04.80	13 Q	1:05.43	15	Did not advance	
Martina Elhenická	Girls' 200m Backstroke	2:17.86	11			Did not advance	
Martina Elhenická	Girls' 200m Individual Medley	2:21.68	9			Did not advance	

- * qualified due to the withdrawal of another swimmer

== Table tennis ==
Individual

Athlete	Event	Round 1		Round 2		Quarterfinals	Semifinals	Final	Rank
Athlete	Event	Group Matches	Rank	Group Matches	Rank	Quarterfinals	Semifinals	Final	Rank
Ondřej Bajger	Boys' Singles	Marakkala (SRI); W 3–2 (15–13, 11–8, 9–11, 8–11, 11–9)	2 Q	Hung (TPE); L 1–3 (6–11, 6–11, 11–8, 5–11)	3	Did not advance			9
Ondřej Bajger	Boys' Singles	Chiu (HKG); L 0–3 (10–12, 5–11, 9–11)	2 Q	Kim (PRK); W 3–0 (11–8, 11–8, 11–9)	3	Did not advance			9
Ondřej Bajger	Boys' Singles	Santiwattanatarm (THA); W 3–0 (11–4, 11–9, 11–6)	2 Q	Vanrossomme (BEL); L 2–3 (2–11, 11–9, 4–11, 11–9, 9–11)	3	Did not advance			9

Team

Athlete	Event	Round 1		Round 2	Quarterfinals	Semifinals	Final	Rank
Athlete	Event	Group Matches	Rank	Round 2	Quarterfinals	Semifinals	Final	Rank
Europe 5 Katsiaryna Baravok (BLR); Ondřej Bajger (CZE)	Mixed Team	Korea; Yang (KOR); Kim (KOR); L 0–3 (1–3, 1–3, 0–3)	3 qB	Sri Lanka; Vithanage (SRI); Marakkala (SRI); W 2–0 (3–2, 3–2)	Intercontinental 2 Noskova (RUS); Holikov (UZB); W 2–0 (w/o)	Did not advance		17
Europe 5 Katsiaryna Baravok (BLR); Ondřej Bajger (CZE)	Mixed Team	Intercontinental 4 Giardi (SMR); Massah (MAW); W 3–0 (3–1, 3–0, 3–0)	3 qB	Sri Lanka; Vithanage (SRI); Marakkala (SRI); W 2–0 (3–2, 3–2)	Intercontinental 2 Noskova (RUS); Holikov (UZB); W 2–0 (w/o)	Did not advance		17
Europe 5 Katsiaryna Baravok (BLR); Ondřej Bajger (CZE)	Mixed Team	Hungary; Nagyvaradi (HUN); Lakatos (HUN); L 1–2 (0–3, 0–3, 3–1)	3 qB	Sri Lanka; Vithanage (SRI); Marakkala (SRI); W 2–0 (3–2, 3–2)	Intercontinental 2 Noskova (RUS); Holikov (UZB); W 2–0 (w/o)	Did not advance		17

== Tennis ==
Singles

Athlete	Event	Round 1	Round 2	Quarterfinals	Semifinals	Final	Rank
Jiří Veselý	Boys' Singles	Quiroz (ECU); W 2–1 (6–0, 3–6, 6–3)	Gómez (COL); L 0–2 (6–7, 5–7)	Did not advance			
Denisa Allertová	Girls' Singles	Ysidora (INA); W 2–0 (6–3, 6–2)	Jabeur (TUN); L 0–2 (4–6, 2–6)	Did not advance			

Doubles

Athlete	Event	Round 1	Quarterfinals	Semifinals	Final	Rank
Oliver Golding (GBR); Jiří Veselý (CZE)	Boys' Doubles	Ouyang (CHN); Wang (CHN); W 2–1 (6–3, 3–6, [10–6])	Džumhur (BIH); Pavić (CRO); W 2–0 (7–6, 7–5)	Galeano (PAR); Rodriguez (VEN); W 2–0 (6–3, 6–2)	Baluda (RUS); Biryukov (RUS); W 2–0 (6–3, 6–1)	Gold medal
Denisa Allertová (CZE); Mia Radulović (MNE)	Girls' Doubles	Dinu (ROU); Jabeur (TUN); L 1–2 (5–7, 6–3, [1–10])	Did not advance			

== Triathlon ==
Men's

Athlete	Event	Swim (1.5 km)	Trans 1	Bike (40 km)	Trans 2	Run (10 km)	Total	Rank
Lukáš Kočař	Individual	8:54	0:30	28:28	0:25	17:40	55:57.33	6

Mixed

Athlete	Event	Total Times per Athlete (Swim 250 m, Bike 7 km, Run 1.7 km)	Total Group Time	Rank
Marlene Gomez (GER); Jeremy Obozil (FRA); Laura Casey (IRL); Lukáš Kočař (CZE)	Mixed Team Relay; Europe 2	20:53; 19:47; 21:54; 19:37	1:22:11.38	4
