= Slovakia at the 2010 Summer Youth Olympics =

- IOC code: SVK
- NOC: Slovak Olympic and Sports Committee
- Website: www.olympic.sk

in Singapore 14 – 26 August 2010
- Competitors: 17 in 8 sports
- Flag bearer: Arpad Szakacs
- Medals Ranked 63rd: Gold 0 Silver 2 Bronze 3 Total 5

Summer Youth Olympics appearances (overview)
- 2010; 2014; 2018; 2026

Slovakia participated in the 2010 Summer Youth Olympics in Singapore.

The Slovak squad consisted of 17 athletes competing in 8 sports: aquatics (swimming), athletics, canoeing, fencing, judo, modern pentathlon, rowing and tennis.

== Medalists ==
Medal	Name	Sport	Event	Date
Gold	Andrea Krisandova	Judo	Mixed Team	25 Aug
Silver	Jana Cepelova; Chantal Škamlová	Tennis	Girls' Doubles	21 Aug
Silver	Miroslav Urban	Canoeing	K1 Slalom Boys	25 Aug
Bronze	Jana Cepelova	Tennis	Girls' Singles	19 Aug
Bronze	Filip Horanský; Jozef Kovalík	Tennis	Boys' Doubles	19 Aug
Bronze	Arpad Szakacs	Judo	Boys' 81kg	22 Aug

== Athletics ==
=== Girls ===
Track and Road Events

Athletes	Event	Qualification		Final	
Athletes	Event	Result	Rank	Result	Rank
Katarina Strmenova	Girls’ 5km Walk			23:24.65	8

Field Events

Athletes	Event	Qualification		Final	
Athletes	Event	Result	Rank	Result	Rank
Claudia Hladikova	Girls’ Long Jump	5.61	12 qB	5.45	14

== Canoeing ==
Boys

Athlete	Event	Time Trial		Round 1	Round 2 (Rep)	Round 3	Round 4	Round 5	Final	Rank
Athlete	Event	Time	Rank	Round 1	Round 2 (Rep)	Round 3	Round 4	Round 5	Final	Rank
Miroslav Urban	Boys’ K1 Slalom	1:28.62	3	Welh (LBR); W 1:28.96-2:14.23		Tsarykovich (BLR); W 1:30.97-1:46.62	Smith (GBR); W 1:28.02-1:35.57	Bernis (FRA); W 1:27.42-1:27.78	Brus (SLO); L 1:30.24-1:25.15	2nd place, silver medalist(s)
Miroslav Urban	Boys’ K1 Sprint	1:58.48	22	Aghamirzaeijenaghrad (IRI); L 1:56.99-1:33.26	Brus (SLO); L 2:05.70-1:35.57	did not advance				

== Fencing ==
Group Stage

Athlete	Event	Match 1	Match 2	Match 3	Match 4	Match 5	Seed
Michala Cellerova	Girls’ Foil	Barrera (ESA); W 5–2	Wong (SIN); L 1–5	Choi (KOR); W 5–2	Lupkovics (HUN); L 0–5	Wang (CHN); W 5–0	7

Knock-Out Stage

Athlete	Event	Round of 16	Quarterfinals	Semifinals	Final	Rank
Michala Cellerova	Girls’ Foil	Choi (KOR); W 15–13	Lupkovics (HUN); L 12–15	did not advance		7
Europe 4 Kenza Boudad (FRA); Lucian Ciovica (ROU); Michala Cellerova (SVK); Arthur Zatko (FRA); Amalia Tătăran (ROU); Alexander Choupenitch (CZE)	Mixed Team		Asia-Oceania 1 L 24–30	5th–8th Asia-Oceania 2 W 30–20	5th–6th Europe 3 W 30–29	5

== Judo ==
Individual

Athlete	Event	Round 1	Round 2	Round 3	Semifinals	Final	Rank
Athlete	Event	Opposition Result	Opposition Result	Opposition Result	Opposition Result	Opposition Result	Rank
Arpad Szakacs	Boys' −81 kg	Fernandez (HON); W 100–000	Khalmurzaev (RUS); L 001–101	Repechage; Omerovic (BIH); W 100–000	Repechage; Greiter (AUT); W 110–000	Bronze Medal Match; Ntanatsidis (GRE); W 011–000	
Andrea Krisandova	Girls' −52 kg	Geldybayeva (TKM); L 000–000*	Repechage; Prince (NED); L 000–001	did not advance			13

Team

Team	Event	Round 1	Round 2	Semifinals	Final	Rank
Team	Event	Opposition Result	Opposition Result	Opposition Result	Opposition Result	Rank
Essen; Lesly Cano (PER); Pedro Rivadulla (ESP); Andrea Krisandova (SVK); Kairat Agibayev (KAZ); Daryl Lokuku Ngambomo (COD); Miku Tashiro (JPN); Alex Maxell Garcia Mendoza (CUB)	Mixed Team	Munich; W 4–3	Chiba; W 5–2	Cairo; W 5–2	Belgrade; W 6–1	Gold medal

== Modern pentathlon ==
Athlete	Event	Fencing (Épée One Touch)			Swimming (200m Freestyle)			Running & Shooting (3000m, Laser Pistol)			Total Points	Final Rank
Athlete	Event	Results	Rank	Points	Time	Rank	Points	Time	Rank	Points	Total Points	Final Rank
Jan Szalay	Boys' Individual	17–6	1	1040	2:10.42	13	1236	12:47.47	23	1932	4208	14
Ela Sedilekova	Girls' Individual	7–16	22	640	2:29.70	21	1004	13:56.72	18	1656	3300	23
Mariana Laporte (BRA); Jan Szalay (SVK)	Mixed Relay	45–47	13	810	2:07.62	15	1272	19:56.98	24	1296	3378	24
Ela Sedilekova (SVK); Valentin Prades (FRA)	Mixed Relay	56–36	2	920	2:10.03	21	1240	15:45.63	10	2300	4460	7

== Rowing ==
Athlete	Event	Heats		Repechage		Semifinals		Final		Overall Rank
Athlete	Event	Time	Rank	Time	Rank	Time	Rank	Time	Rank	Overall Rank
Andre Redr	Boys' Single Sculls	3:27.54	1 QA/B			3:36.12	5 QB	DNS		

== Swimming ==
Athletes	Event	Heat		Semifinal		Final	
Athletes	Event	Time	Position	Time	Position	Time	Position
Pavol Jelenak	Boys’ 200m Freestyle	1:57.82	32			Did not advance	
Pavol Jelenak	Boys’ 400m Freestyle	4:09.98	24			Did not advance	
Martin Fakla	Boys’ 50m Backstroke			27.54	10	Did not advance	
Martin Fakla	Boys’ 100m Backstroke	1:00.06	25	Did not advance			
Katarina Listopadova	Girls’ 100m Freestyle	57.35	5 Q	56.78	3 Q	56.90	4
Katarina Listopadova	Girls’ 200m Freestyle	2:07.63	23			Did not advance	
Katarina Listopadova	Girls’ 50m Butterfly	28.06	5 Q	27.79	7 Q	27.38	4
Katarina Listopadova	Girls’ 100m Butterfly	1:02.12	13 Q	1:01.27	6 Q	1:00.35	4
Aurelia Trnovcova	Girls’ 50m Breaststroke	34.08	17	Did not advance			
Aurelia Trnovcova	Girls’ 100m Breaststroke	1:15.99	25	Did not advance			

== Tennis ==
Singles

Athlete	Event	Round 1	Round 2	Quarterfinals	Semifinals	Final	Rank
Jozef Kovalík	Boys' Singles	Micov (MKD); W 2–0 (7–5, 6–1)	Fernandes (BRA); L 0–2 (6–7, 1–6)	Did not advance			
Filip Horanský	Boys' Singles	Zsiga (HUN); L 0–2 (3–6, 2–6)	Consolation; Galeano (PAR); W 2–1 (4–6, 6–4, [10–3])	Consolation; Triki (TUN); W 2–0 (7–6, 6–1)	Consolation; King (BAR); L 1–2 (6–0, 6–7, [6–10])	Did not advance	
Jana Čepelová	Girls' Singles	Eskenazi (ARG); W 2–0 (6–1, 3–1RET)	Grage (DEN); W 2–1 (3–6, 7–6, 6–4)	Kumkhum (THA); W 2–0 (6–3, 6–4)	Gavrilova (RUS); L 1–2 (7–5, 5–7, 3–6)	Bronze Medal Match; Babos (HUN); W 2–0 (6–2, 7–5)	
Chantal Škamlová	Girls' Singles	Gámiz (VEN); W 2–0 (6–3, 7–6)	Babos (HUN); L 0–2 (5–7, 3–6)	Did not advance			

Doubles

Athlete	Event	Round 1	Quarterfinals	Semifinals	Final	Rank
Filip Horanský (SVK); Jozef Kovalík (SVK)	Boys' Doubles	Colella (ITA); Morrissey (IRL); W 2–0 (6–2, 7–5)	Acosta (ECU); Quiroz (ECU); W 2–0 (7–6, 6–2)	Baluda (RUS); Biryukov (RUS); L 0–2 (4–6, 5–7)	Bronze Medal Match; Galeano (PAR); Rodriguez (VEN); W 2–0 (7–5, 6–4)	
Jana Čepelová (SVK); Chantal Škamlová (SVK)	Girls' Doubles	Gámiz (VEN); Pérez (VEN); W 2–0 (6–3, 7–6)	Grage (DEN); Kremen (BLR); W 2–0 (6–4, 6–3)	Gavrilova (RUS); Putintseva (RUS); W 2–0 (6–4, 7–6)	Tang (CHN); Zheng (CHN); L 1–2 (4–6, 6–3, [4–10])	Silver medal
