= Venezuela at the 2010 Summer Youth Olympics =

- IOC code: VEN
- NOC: Venezuelan Olympic Committee
- Website: www.covoficial.com.ve

in Singapore
- Competitors: 21 in 9 sports
- Flag bearer: Samuel Zapata
- Medals Ranked 63rd: Gold 0 Silver 2 Bronze 3 Total 5

Summer Youth Olympics appearances (overview)
- 2010; 2014; 2018; 2026

A total 21 Venezuelan athletes participated in 9 sports at the 2010 Summer Youth Olympics in Singapore.

== Medalists ==
Medal	Name	Sport	Event	Date
Silver	Cristian Quintero	Swimming	Youth Men's 200m Freestyle Final	16 Aug
Silver	Samuel Zapata	Boxing	Men's Light Welter 64kg	25 Aug
Bronze	Génesis Rodríguez	Weightlifting	Women's 48 kg	15 Aug
Bronze	Cristian Quintero	Swimming	Youth Men's 400m Freestyle Final	15 Aug
Bronze	Fradimil Macayo	Boxing	Men's Feather 57kg	24 Aug
Bronze	Pedro Pineda	Judo	Mixed Event	25 Aug

== Boxing ==
Boys

Athlete	Event	Preliminaries	Semifinals	Final	Rank
Fradimil Macayo	Featherweight (57kg)	Jakub Chval (CZE); W 15–2	Elvin Isayev (AZE); L 6–10	3rd place bout Denislav Suslekov (BUL); W 8–3	Bronze medal
Samuel Zapata	Light Welterweight (64kg)	Lyndell Marcellin (LCA); W 11–0	Fabián Maidana (ARG); W 4–2	Ričardas Kuncaitis (LTU); L 6–12	Silver medal

== Diving ==
Boys

Athlete	Event	Preliminary		Final	
Athlete	Event	Points	Rank	Points	Rank
Robert Páez	Boys’ 3m Springboard	452.65	11 Q	458.70	12
Robert Páez	Boys’ 10m Platform	464.50	5 Q	483.20	5

Girls

Athlete	Event	Preliminary		Final	
Athlete	Event	Points	Rank	Points	Rank
Beannelys Velasquez	Girls’ 3m Springboard	342.45	9 Q	359.20	10

== Fencing ==
Group Stage

Athlete	Event	Match 1	Match 2	Match 3	Match 4	Match 5	Seed
Maria Carreno	Girls’ Sabre	Seo (KOR); W 5–4	Ciardullo (ITA); L 1–5	Boudad (FRA); L 2–5	Ahmed (EGY); L 4–5	Egoryan (RUS); L 3–5	11

Knock-Out Stage

Athlete	Event	Round of 16	Quarterfinals	Semifinals	Final	Rank
Maria Carreno	Girls’ Sabre	Egoryan (RUS); L 7–15	Did not advance			11
Americas 2 Maria Carreno (VEN); Guilherme Melaragno (BRA); Mona Shaito (USA); Miguel Breault-Mallette (CAN); Clara Isabel Di Tella (ARG); Redys Prades Rosabal (CUB)	Mixed Team	Africa; W 28–25	Europe 1 L 17–30	5th–8th Europe 3 L 23–30	7th–8th Asia-Oceania 2 W 28–27	7

== Gymnastics ==
=== Artistic Gymnastics ===
Boys

Athlete	Event	Floor		Pommel Horse		Rings		Vault		Parallel Bars		Horizontal Bar		Total	
Athlete	Event	Score	Rank	Score	Rank	Score	Rank	Score	Rank	Score	Rank	Score	Rank	Score	Rank
Junior Rojo	Boys' Qualification	13.600	21	11.800	31	13.450	21	15.000	21	13.350	17	12.300	35	79.500	29

Girls

Athlete	Event	Vault		Uneven Bars		Beam		Floor		Total	
Athlete	Event	Score	Rank	Score	Rank	Score	Rank	Score	Rank	Score	Rank
Kosthia Requena	Girls' Qualification	13.200	23	12.000	21	13.150	14	12.550	18	50.900	16 Q
Kosthia Requena	Girls' Individual All-Around	13.350	15	11.150	16	13.250	9	12.150	15	49.900	15

== Judo ==
Individual

Athlete	Event	Round 1	Round 2	Round 3	Semifinals	Final	Rank
Athlete	Event	Opposition Result	Opposition Result	Opposition Result	Opposition Result	Opposition Result	Rank
Pedro Pineda	Boys' −100 kg	Villalba (ARG); W 021–100	Igarashi (JPN); L 000–021	Repechage; Glusac (SRB); L 000–100	Did not advance		9

Team

Team	Event	Round 1	Round 2	Semifinals	Final	Rank
Team	Event	Opposition Result	Opposition Result	Opposition Result	Opposition Result	Rank
Cairo; Neha Thakur (IND); Mansurkhuja Muminkhujaev (UZB); Christine Huck (AUT); Ioan Visan (ROU); Andrea Guillen (CRC); Eldin Omerovic (BIH); Barbara Matić (CRO); Pedro Pineda (VEN)	Mixed Team	Birmingham; W 5–2	Hamilton; W 4–4 (3–2)	Essen; L 2–5	Did not advance	Bronze medal

== Swimming ==
Boys

Athlete	Events	Heat		Semifinal		Final	
Athlete	Events	Time	Position	Time	Position	Time	Position
Cristian Quintero	50m Freestyle	23.41	6 Q	23.25	7 Q	23.70	8
Cristian Quintero	100m Freestyle	50.82	2 Q	50.55	3 Q	50.47	4
Cristian Quintero	200m Freestyle	1:50.93	2 Q			1:49.98	2nd place, silver medalist(s)
Cristian Quintero	400m Freestyle	3:54.91	2 Q			3:53.44	3rd place, bronze medalist(s)
Juan Sequera	200m Individual Medley	2:06.64	15	Did not advance			

Girls

Athlete	Events	Heat		Semifinal		Final	
Athlete	Events	Time	Position	Time	Position	Time	Position
Bieliukas Trejo Oriana	100m Freestyle	58.90	25	Did not advance			
Erika Torreallas	100m Butterfly	1:01.72	11 Q	1:01.78	12	Did not advance	

== Tennis ==
Singles

Athlete	Event	Round 1	Round 2	Quarterfinals	Semifinals	Final	Rank
Ricard Rodriguez	Boys' Singles	Olivo (ARG); W 2–0 (7–6, 6–3)	Baluda (RUS); L 1–2 (2–6, 6–4, 3–6)	Did not advance			
Adriana Pérez	Girls' Singles	Kumkhum (THA); L 1–2 (7–6, 2–6, 3–6)	Consolation; Rasolomalala (MAD); W 2–0 (6–4, 6–3)	Consolation; Ishizu (JPN); L 0–2 (1–6, 3–6)	Did not advance		
Andrea Gámiz	Girls' Singles	Škamlová (SVK); L 0–2 (3–6, 6–7)	Consolation; Puig (PUR); W 2–1 (3–6, 6–3, [11–9])	Consolation; Friedsam (GER); L 1–2 (2–6, 7–5, [7–10])	Did not advance		

Doubles

Athlete	Event	Round 1	Quarterfinals	Semifinals	Final	Rank
Diego Galeano (PAR); Ricardo Rodriguez (VEN)	Boys' Doubles	Huang (TPE); Uchiyama (JPN); W 2–0 (6–4, 6–4)	Fernandes (BRA); Olivo (ARG); W 2–0 (6–4, 6–4)	Golding (GBR); Vesely (CZE); L 0–2 (3–6, 2–6)	Bronze medal match Horanský (SVK); Kovalík (SVK); L 0–2 (5–7, 4–6)	4
Andrea Gámiz (VEN); Adriana Pérez (VEN)	Girls' Doubles	Čepelová (SVK); Škamlová (SVK); L 0–2 (3–6, 6–7)	Did not advance			

== Triathlon ==
Girls

Triathlete	Event	Swimming	Transit 1	Cycling	Transit 2	Running	Total time	Rank
Andrea Arenas	Individual	10:14	0:36	33:40	0:27	23:52	1:08:49.53	24

Men's

Athlete	Event	Swim (1.5 km)	Trans 1	Bike (40 km)	Trans 2	Run (10 km)	Total	Rank
Carlos Peres	Individual	8:54	0:31	29:49	0:24	17:57	57:35.52	18

Mixed

Athlete	Event	Total Times per Athlete (Swim 250 m, Bike 7 km, Run 1.7 km)	Total Group Time	Rank
Andrea Arenas (VEN); Gabriel Zumbado (CRC); Viviana González (COL); Andres Diaz (COL)	Mixed Team Relay; Americas 4	23:17; 20:44; 23:30; 20:21	1:27:52.84	14
Jessica Piedra (ECU); Carlos Perez (VEN); Leslie Amat Alvarez (CUB); Iuri Vinuto (BRA)	Mixed Team Relay; Americas 3	22:30; 19:53; 23:32; 20:39	1:26:34.25	11

== Weightlifting ==
Athlete	Event	Snatch	Clean & Jerk	Total	Rank
Juan Prado	Boys' 56kg	100	118	218	6
Génesis Rodríguez	Girls' 48kg	71	83	154	Bronze medal

== Wrestling ==
Freestyle

Athlete	Event	Pools		Final	Rank
Athlete	Event	Groups	Rank	Final	Rank
Andry Davila	Boys' 46kg	Rios (PER); W Fall (7–0)	2	3rd place match Hovhannisyan (ARM); L 0–2 (0–4, 1–5)	4
Andry Davila	Boys' 46kg	Sheikhi (IRI); L 0–2 (1–3, 0–1)	2	3rd place match Hovhannisyan (ARM); L 0–2 (0–4, 1–5)	4
Oriannys Segura	Girls' 46kg	Olli (FIN); L 0–2 (0–1, 1–5)	3	5th place match Holland (AUS); W 2–0 (4–0, 5–0)	5
Oriannys Segura	Girls' 46kg	Miyahara (JPN); L 0–2 (1–4, 0–2)	3	5th place match Holland (AUS); W 2–0 (4–0, 5–0)	5
