= Hungary at the 2010 Summer Youth Olympics =

- IOC code: HUN
- NOC: Hungarian Olympic Committee
- Website: www.olympic-hun.org

in Singapore
- Competitors: 51 in 18 sports
- Flag bearer: Gergely Demeter
- Medals Ranked 8th: Gold 6 Silver 4 Bronze 5 Total 15

Summer Youth Olympics appearances (overview)
- 2010; 2014; 2018

Hungary competed at the 2010 Summer Youth Olympics, the inaugural Youth Olympic Games, held in Singapore from 14 August to 26 August 2010.

== Medalists ==
Medal	Name	Sport	Event	Date
Gold	Boglárka Kapás	Swimming	Youth Women's 200m butterfly	16 Aug
Gold	Eszter Dudás	Triathlon	Mixed Relay (in mixed-NOC team with Europe 1)	19 Aug
Gold	Péter Bernek	Swimming	Youth Men's 200m backstroke	20 Aug
Gold	Bence Biczó	Swimming	Youth Men's 200m butterfly	20 Aug
Gold	Boglárka Kapás	Swimming	Youth Women's 400m freestyle	20 Aug
Gold	Ramóna Farkasdi	Canoeing	K1 Head to head Canoe Sprint Women	22 Aug
Gold	Sándor Tótka	Canoeing	K1 Head to head Canoe Sprint Men	22 Aug
Silver	Boglárka Kapás	Swimming	Youth Women's 200m freestyle	18 Aug
Silver	Zsófia Földházi	Modern pentathlon	Girls' Individual	21 Aug
Silver	Barbara Batizi	Judo	Girls' 44kg	21 Aug
Silver	Krisztina Váradi	Athletics	Girls' Discus throw	21 Aug
Bronze	Dóra Lupkovics	Fencing	Cadet Female Foil	15 Aug
Bronze	Balázs Zámbó	Swimming	Youth Men's 200m backstroke	20 Aug
Bronze	Tímea Babos	Tennis	Girls' Doubles (in mixed-NOC team with BEL)	21 Aug
Bronze	Krisztián Tóth	Judo	Boys' 81 kg	22 Aug
Bronze	Balázs Töreky	Athletics	Boys' hammer throw	23 Aug
Bronze	Zoltán Harcsa	Boxing	Men's Middle 75kg	24 Aug

== Archery ==
Boys

Athlete	Event	Ranking Round		Round of 32	Round of 16	Quarterfinals	Semifinals	Final	
Athlete	Event	Score	Seed	Opposition Score	Opposition Score	Opposition Score	Opposition Score	Opposition Score	Rank
Sebastian Linster	Boys’ Individual	559	27	Rajh (SLO); L 4–6	Did not advance				17

Mixed Team

Athlete	Event	Partner	Round of 32	Round of 16	Quarterfinals	Semifinals	Final	
Athlete	Event	Partner	Opposition Score	Opposition Score	Opposition Score	Opposition Score	Opposition Score	Rank
Sebastian Linster	Mixed Team	Seema Verma (IND)	Wojnicka (POL)/ Yilmaz (TUR); L 2–6	Did not advance				17

== Athletics ==
=== Boys ===
Field Events

Athletes	Event	Qualification		Final	
Athletes	Event	Result	Rank	Result	Rank
János Káplár	Boys’ Discus Throw	53.67	10 qB	57.95	9
Balázs Töreky	Boys’ Hammer Throw	71.30	4 Q	70.13	Bronze medal

=== Girls ===
Track and Road Events

Athletes	Event	Qualification		Final	
Athletes	Event	Result	Rank	Result	Rank
Anasztázia Nguyen	Girls’ 100m	11.89	5 Q	11.81	5

Field Events

Athletes	Event	Qualification		Final	
Athletes	Event	Result	Rank	Result	Rank
Krisztina Váradi	Girls’ Discus Throw	47.02	4 Q	49.92	Silver medal
Fruzsina Fertig	Girls’ Hammer Throw	53.91	8 Q	51.01	7
Réka Czúth	Girls’ High Jump	1.70	11 qB	1.72	11
Diana Szabó	Girls’ Pole Vault	3.35	14 qB	3.45	13

== Boxing ==
Boys

Athlete	Event	Preliminaries	Semifinals	Final	Rank
Zoltán Harcsa	Middleweight (75kg)	Adlet Rakishev (KAZ); W 6–1	Damien Hooper (AUS); L 0–4	3rd Place Bout; Muideen Akanjo (NGR); W 8–1	Bronze medal
Jozsef Zsigmond	Super Heavyweight (+91kg)		Joseph Parker (NZL); L RET R2 0:37	3rd Place Bout; Daniil Svaresciuc (MDA); L RET R3 1:29	4

== Canoeing ==
Boys

Athlete	Event	Time Trial		Round 1	Round 2 (Rep)	Round 3	Round 4	Round 5	Final	Rank
Athlete	Event	Time	Rank	Round 1	Round 2 (Rep)	Round 3	Round 4	Round 5	Final	Rank
Sandor Totka	Boys’ K1 Slalom	1:43.50	13	Silva (POR); L 1:45.40-1:42.73	Nedyalkov (BUL); W 1:48.85-DNF	Brus (SLO); L 1:43.38-1:27.81	Did not advance			
Sandor Totka	Boys’ K1 Sprint	1:29.39	1			Nedyalkov (BUL); W 1:30.14-1:35.53	Zelnychenko (UKR); W 1:32.18-1:34.05	Garcia (ESP); W 1:31.17-1:36.68	Liebscher (GER); W 1:28.91-1:29.05	Gold medal

Girls

Athlete	Event	Time Trial		Round 1	Round 2 (Rep)	Round 3	Round 4	Round 5	Final	Rank
Athlete	Event	Time	Rank	Round 1	Round 2 (Rep)	Round 3	Round 4	Round 5	Final	Rank
Ramona Farkasdi	Girls’ K1 Slalom	2:03.19	19	Grewelding (GER); L 2:04.21-1:41.60	Bruska (POL); L 2:00.08-1:53.93	Did not advance				
Ramona Farkasdi	Girls’ K1 Sprint	1:40.64	1	Denhollander (CAN); W 1:40.17-2:21.85		Afef (TUN); W 1:39.65-2:04.25	Segal (RSA); W 1:44.14-1:52.97	Peters (BEL); W 1:41.42-1:53.49	Huang (CHN); W 1:41.26-1:44.73	Gold medal

== Cycling ==
Cross Country

Athlete	Event	Time	Rank	Points
Peter Fenyvesi	Boys’ Cross Country	1:03:50	14	66
Zsofia Keri	Girls’ Cross Country	56:51	17	40

Time Trial

Athlete	Event	Time	Rank	Points
Ferenc Stuban	Boys’ Time Trial	4:31.31	28	30
Zsofia Keri	Girls’ Time Trial	3:46.03	24	40

BMX

Athlete	Event	Seeding Round		Quarterfinals							Semifinals							Final		
Athlete	Event	Seeding Round		Run 1		Run 2		Run 3		Rank	Run 1		Run 2		Run 3		Rank	Final		
Athlete	Event	Time	Rank	Time	Rank	Time	Rank	Time	Rank	Rank	Time	Rank	Time	Rank	Time	Rank	Rank	Time	Rank	Points
Patrik Szoboszlai	Boys’ BMX	34.168	18	48.199	6	34.401	5	33.772	4	5	Did not advance									72
Zsofia Keri	Girls’ BMX	45.912	16	45.714	4	45.724	4	45.361	4	4 Q	45.613	8	45.488	8	45.404	8	8	Did not advance		38

Road Race

Athlete	Event	Time	Rank	Points
Ferenc Stuban	Boys’ Road Race	1:05:44	36	72
Peter Fenyvesi	Boys’ Road Race	1:05:44	47	
Patrik Szoboszlai	Boys’ Road Race	DNF		

Overall

Team	Event	Cross Country Pts		Time Trial Pts		BMX Pts		Road Race Pts	Total	Rank
Team	Event	Boys	Girls	Boys	Girls	Boys	Girls	Road Race Pts	Total	Rank
Zsofia Keri; Peter Fenyvesi; Ferenc Stuban; Patrik Szobozlai	Mixed Team	66	40	30	40	72	38	72	358	29

== Fencing ==
Group Stage

Athlete	Event	Match 1	Match 2	Match 3	Match 4	Match 5	Match 6	Seed
Antal Györgyi	Boys’ Foil	Lichagin (RUS); L 4–5	Tofalides (GBR); L 0–5	Lee (KOR); L 3–5	Mahmoud (EGY); L 2–5	Luperi (ITA); L 0–5		13
András Szatmári	Boys’ Sabre	Spear (USA); L 3–5	Okunev (RUS); L 4–5	Mallette (CAN); W 5–1	Affede (ITA); W 5–3	Song (KOR); W 5–0		5
Dóra Lupkovics	Girls’ Foil	Barrera (ESA); W 5–4	Wong (SIN); W 5–1	Choi (KOR); W 5–4	Wang (CHN); L 3–5	Cellerova (SVK); W 5–0		2

Knock-Out Stage

Athlete	Event	Round of 16	Quarterfinals	Semifinals	Final	Rank
Antal Györgyi	Boys’ Foil	Lee (KOR); L 8–15	Did not advance			13
András Szatmári	Boys’ Sabre	Song (KOR); L 14–15	Did not advance			9
Dóra Lupkovicks	Girls’ Foil		Cellerova (SVK); W 15–12	Alexeeva (RUS); L 11–15	Goldie (CAN); W 15–10	Bronze medal
Europe 3 Alina Komaschuk (UKR); Tomasz Kruk (POL); Dora Lupkovics (HUN); Mikhail Akula (BLR); Yulia Bakhareva (RUS); Kirill Lichagin (RUS)	Mixed Team		Americas 1 L 28–30	5th–8th Americas 2 W 30–23	5th–6th Europe 4 L 29–30	6

== Gymnastics ==
=== Artistic Gymnastics ===
Boys

Athlete	Event	Floor		Pommel Horse		Rings		Vault		Parallel Bars		Horizontal Bar		Total	
Athlete	Event	Score	Rank	Score	Rank	Score	Rank	Score	Rank	Score	Rank	Score	Rank	Score	Rank
Levente Vagner	Boys' Qualification	13.250	27	13.650	7 Q	13.600	17	14.650	35	13.600	14	12.850	27	81.600	14 Q
Levente Vagner	Boys' Individual All-Around	13.500	14	13.100	10	13.650	7	14.450	18	13.650	10	12.900	16	81.250	13

Athlete	Event	Score	Rank
Levente Vagner	Boys' Pommel Horse	13.425	5

Girls

Athlete	Event	Vault		Uneven Bars		Beam		Floor		Total	
Athlete	Event	Score	Rank	Score	Rank	Score	Rank	Score	Rank	Score	Rank
Bianka Szabina Mityko	Girls' Qualification	13.650	10 Q	11.250	27	12.700	21	12.750	14	50.350	19

Athlete	Event	Score	Rank
Bianka Szabina Mityko	Girls' Vault	13.237	8

== Judo ==
Individual

Athlete	Event	Round 1	Round 2	Round 3	Semifinals	Final	Rank
Athlete	Event	Opposition Result	Opposition Result	Opposition Result	Opposition Result	Opposition Result	Rank
Krisztian Toth	Boys' −81 kg	Shalabi (LBA); W 002–000	Greiter (AUT); W 002–000		Khalmurzaev (RUS); L 000–001	Bronze Medal Match; Efemgil (TUR); W 100–001	
Barbara Batizi	Girls' −44 kg	BYE	Valnova (BLR); W 101–000		Sam (CAM); W 020–000	Bae (KOR); L 000–011	Silver medal

Team

Team	Event	Round 1	Round 2	Semifinals	Final	Rank
Team	Event	Opposition Result	Opposition Result	Opposition Result	Opposition Result	Rank
Birmingham; Fahariya Takidine (COM); Ecaterina Guica (CAN); Song Chol Hyon (PRK); Neo Kapenko (BOT); Chin Jie Lim (SIN); Kadijah Maxwell (BAR); Krisztian Toth (HUN)	Mixed Team	Cairo; L 2–5	Did not advance			9
Paris; Barbara Batizi (HUN); Patrick Marxer (LIE); Maja Rasinska (POL); Farshid Ghasemi Asl (IRI); Sophina Arrey (CMR); Khasan Khalmurzaev (RUS); Sana Khelifi (ALG); Fernando Vanoye (MEX)	Mixed Team	Tokyo; L 3–5	Did not advance			9

== Modern pentathlon ==
Athlete	Event	Fencing (Épée One Touch)			Swimming (200m Freestyle)			Running & Shooting (3000m, Laser Pistol)			Total Points	Final Rank
Athlete	Event	Results	Rank	Points	Time	Rank	Points	Time	Rank	Points	Total Points	Final Rank
Gergely Demeter	Boys' Individual	10–13	16	760	2:02.24	2	1336	10:41.15	1	2436	4532	4
Zsófia Földházi	Girls' Individual	16–7	3	1000	2:09.30	1	1252	13:14.14	11	1824	4076	Silver medal
Sindija Roga (LAT); Gergely Demeter (HUN)	Mixed Relay	34–58	24	700	2:03.78	6	1316	17:03.05	22	1988	4004	22
Zsófia Földházi (HUN); Aliaksandr Biruk (BLR)	Mixed Relay	45–47	13	810	1:58.39	1	1380	15:36.70	7	2336	4526	4

== Rowing ==
Athlete	Event	Heats		Repechage		Semifinals		Final		Overall Rank
Athlete	Event	Time	Rank	Time	Rank	Time	Rank	Time	Rank	Overall Rank
Mark Biro	Boys' Single Sculls	3:29.91	2 QR	3:34.31	1 QA/B	3:34.40	4 QB	3:28.00	1	7
Szimona Uglik; Hella Kiss	Girls' Pair	3:40.12	2 QA/B			3:46.22	3 QA	3:40.58	6	6

== Sailing ==
One Person Dinghy

Athlete	Event	Race												Points	Rank
Athlete	Event	1	2	3	4	5	6	7	8	9	10	11	M*	Points	Rank
Peter Batho	Boys' Byte CII	~~OCS~~	18	26	3	7	9	18	3	17	25	~~OCS~~	14	140	19

Windsurfing

Athlete	Event	Race											Points	Rank
Athlete	Event	1	2	3	4	5	6	7	8	9	10	M*	Points	Rank
Andras Nikl	Boys' Techno 293	12	9	12	5	18	16	~~DSQ~~	11	16	12	9	120	12

== Shooting ==
Pistol

Athlete	Event	Qualification		Final		
Athlete	Event	Score	Rank	Score	Total	Rank
Csaba Bartók	Boys' 10m Air Pistol	528	20	Did not advance		

Rifle

Athlete	Event	Qualification		Final		
Athlete	Event	Score	Rank	Score	Total	Rank
István Kapás	Boys' 10m Air Rifle	585	12	Did not advance		
Katinka Szijj	Girls' 10m Air Rifle	388	14	Did not advance		

== Swimming ==
Boys

Athletes	Event	Heat		Semifinal		Final	
Athletes	Event	Time	Position	Time	Position	Time	Position
Péter Bernek	Boys’ 100m Freestyle	51.40	7 Q	Withdrew		Did not advance	
Péter Bernek	Boys’ 200m Freestyle	2:03.01	42			Did not advance	
Péter Bernek	Boys’ 400m Freestyle	3:58.47	8 Q			3:56.77	8
Péter Bernek	Boys’ 100m Backstroke	57.10	3 Q	56.97	5 Q	56.33	4
Péter Bernek	Boys’ 200m Backstroke	2:00.49	1 Q			1:59.18	Gold medal
Balazs Zambo	Boys’ 400m Freestyle	3:57.75	5 Q			3:56.56	6
Balazs Zambo	Boys’ 200m Backstroke	2:04.38	4 Q			2:01.60	Bronze medal
Bence Biczó	Boys’ 100m Butterfly	54.76	8 Q	54.03	4 Q	53.99	6
Bence Biczó	Boys’ 200m Butterfly	1:58.63	1 Q			1:55.89	Gold medal
Zsombor Szana	Boys’ 200m Butterfly	2:02.51	8 Q			2:01.51	7
Zsombor Szana	Boys’ 200m Individual Medley	2:05.78	13			Did not advance	
Péter Bernek; Zsombor Szana; Bence Biczó; Balázs Zambo	Boys’ 4x100m Medley Relay	3:49.19	7 Q			3:47.27	7

Girls

Athletes	Event	Heat		Semifinal		Final	
Athletes	Event	Time	Position	Time	Position	Time	Position
Agnes Bucz	Girls’ 100m Freestyle	57.70	8 Q	56.97	6 Q	57.40	6
Agnes Bucz	Girls’ 200m Freestyle	2:05.90	16			Did not advance	
Boglárka Kapás	Girls’ 200m Freestyle	2:02.84	3 Q			2:00.99	Silver medal
Boglárka Kapás	Girls’ 400m Freestyle	4:16.02	2 Q			4:10.37	Gold medal
Boglárka Kapás	Girls’ 200m Butterfly	2:11.97	1 Q			2:08.72	Gold medal
Anna Olasz	Girls’ 400m Freestyle	4:19.71	8 Q			4:20.24	8
Diana Ambrus	Girls’ 100m Butterfly	1:04.14	23	Did not advance			
Diana Ambrus	Girls’ 200m Butterfly	2:13.88	3 Q			2:12.90	4
Boglárka Kapás; Diana Ambrus; Anna Olasz; Ágnes Bucz	Girls’ 4x100m Freestyle Relay	3:57.34	7 Q			3:56.42	7

== Table tennis ==
Individual

Athlete	Event	Round 1		Round 2		Quarterfinals	Semifinals	Final	Rank
Athlete	Event	Group Matches	Rank	Group Matches	Rank	Quarterfinals	Semifinals	Final	Rank
Tamas Lakatos	Boys' Singles	Kim (PRK); W 3–2 (11–8, 7–11, 11–13, 11–6, 12–10)	1 Q	Kim (KOR); W 3–2 (11–8, 3–11, 11–5, 8–11, 11–8)	2 Q	Soderlund (SWE); W 4–2 (11–7, 11–3, 4–11, 11–8, 1–11, 11–4)	Hung (TPE); L 0–4 (3–11, 8–11, 3–11, 8–11)	Guazy (FRA); L 1–4 (2–11, 10–12, 11–9, 9–11, 8–11)	4
Tamas Lakatos	Boys' Singles	Bedair (EGY); W 3–0 (11–6, 11–7, 12–10)	1 Q	Niwa (JPN); L 0–3 (5–11, 7–11, 2–11)	2 Q	Soderlund (SWE); W 4–2 (11–7, 11–3, 4–11, 11–8, 1–11, 11–4)	Hung (TPE); L 0–4 (3–11, 8–11, 3–11, 8–11)	Guazy (FRA); L 1–4 (2–11, 10–12, 11–9, 9–11, 8–11)	4
Tamas Lakatos	Boys' Singles	Tapia (ECU); W 3–0 (11–7, 11–8, 11–8)	1 Q	Hageraats (NED); W 3–1 (11–7, 7–11, 11–5, 11–3)	2 Q	Soderlund (SWE); W 4–2 (11–7, 11–3, 4–11, 11–8, 1–11, 11–4)	Hung (TPE); L 0–4 (3–11, 8–11, 3–11, 8–11)	Guazy (FRA); L 1–4 (2–11, 10–12, 11–9, 9–11, 8–11)	4
Mercedes Nagyvaradi	Girls' Singles	Sawettabut (THA); L 0–3 (4–11, 5–11, 3–11)	3 qB	BYE	1	Did not advance			17
Mercedes Nagyvaradi	Girls' Singles	Laid (ALG); W 3–0 (11–5, 13–11, 11–1)	3 qB	Bhandarkar (IND); W 3–2 (11–2, 11–9, 8–11, 8–11, 11–2)	1	Did not advance			17
Mercedes Nagyvaradi	Girls' Singles	Xiao (POR); L 0–3 (14–16, 6–11, 8–11)	3 qB	Ivoso (CGO); W 3–0 (11–3, 11–2, 11–5)	1	Did not advance			17

Team

Athlete	Event	Round 1		Round 2	Quarterfinals	Semifinals	Final	Rank
Athlete	Event	Group Matches	Rank	Round 2	Quarterfinals	Semifinals	Final	Rank
Hungary; Mercedes Nagyvaradi (HUN); Tamas Lakatos (HUN)	Mixed Team	Intercontinental 4 Giardi (SMR); Massah (MAW); W 3–0 (3–0, 3–0, 3–0)	2 Q	Chinese Taipei; Huang (TPE); Hung (TPE); L 0–2 (2–3, 1–3)	Did not advance			9
Hungary; Mercedes Nagyvaradi (HUN); Tamas Lakatos (HUN)	Mixed Team	Korea; Yang (KOR); Kim (KOR); L 0–3 (0–3, 2–3, 0–3)	2 Q	Chinese Taipei; Huang (TPE); Hung (TPE); L 0–2 (2–3, 1–3)	Did not advance			9
Hungary; Mercedes Nagyvaradi (HUN); Tamas Lakatos (HUN)	Mixed Team	Europe 5 Baravok (BLR); Bajger (CZE); W 2–1 (3–0, 3–0, 1–3)	2 Q	Chinese Taipei; Huang (TPE); Hung (TPE); L 0–2 (2–3, 1–3)	Did not advance			9

== Tennis ==
Singles

Athlete	Event	Round 1	Round 2	Quarterfinals	Semifinals	Final	Rank
Márton Fucsovics	Boys' Singles	Golding (GBR); L 0–2 (5–7, 3–6)	Consolation; Krainik (CAN); L 0–2 (wd)	Did not advance			
Mate Zsiga	Boys' Singles	Horanský (SVK); W 2–0 (6–3, 6–2)	Ouyang (CHN); W 2–0 (6–4, 6–2)	Džumhur (BIH); L 0–2 (4–6, 3–6)	Did not advance		
Tímea Babos	Girls' Singles	Kovalets (UKR); W 2–0 (6–1, 6–2)	Škamlová (SVK); W 2–0 (7–5, 6–3)	Putintseva (RUS); W 2–0 (6–1, 6–3)	Zheng (CHN); L 0–2 (4–6, 1–6)	Bronze Medal Match; Čepelová (SVK); L 0–2 (2–6, 5–7)	4

Doubles

Athlete	Event	Round 1	Quarterfinals	Semifinals	Final	Rank
Márton Fucsovics (HUN); Mate Zsiga (HUN)	Boys' Doubles	Micov (MKD); Triki (TUN); W 2–0 (6–4, 6–2)	Baluda (RUS); Biryukov (RUS); L 0–2 (2–6, 4–6)	Did not advance		
Tímea Babos (HUN); An-Sophie Mestach (BEL)	Girls' Doubles	Rasolomalala (MAD); Razafimahatratra (MAD); W 2–0 (6–1, 6–3)	Ishizu (JPN); Mutaguchi (JPN); W 2–1 (4–6, 6–3, [14–12])	Tang (CHN); Zheng (CHN); L 1–2 (6–3, 3–6, [7–10])	Bronze Medal Match; Gavrilova (RUS); Putintseva (RUS); W 2–0 (6–2, 6–2)	

== Triathlon ==
Girls

Triathlete	Event	Swimming	Transit 1	Cycling	Transit 2	Running	Total time	Rank
Eszter Dudas	Individual	10:04	0:34	31:40	0:26	19:11	1:01:55.06	5

Men's

Athlete	Event	Swim (1.5 km)	Trans 1	Bike (40 km)	Trans 2	Run (10 km)	Total	Rank
Gabor Hanko	Individual	9:18	0:30	29:24	0:22	17:15	56:49.17	9

Mixed

Athlete	Event	Total Times per Athlete (Swim 250 m, Bike 7 km, Run 1.7 km)	Total Group Time	Rank
Monika Oražem (SLO); Gabor Hanko (HUN); Anna Godoy (ESP); Tobias Klesen (GER)	Mixed Team Relay; Europe 3	21:05; 19:29; 22:14; 20:01	1:22:49.66	6
Eszter Dudas (HUN); Miguel Valente Gernandes (POR); Fanny Beisaron (ISR); Alois Knabl (AUT)	Mixed Team Relay; Europe 1	20:46; 18.58; 21:11; 18:56	1:19:51.42	1st place, gold medalist(s)

== Weightlifting ==
Athlete	Event	Snatch	Clean & Jerk	Total	Rank
Lilla Berki	Girls' 48kg	46	57	103	8

== Wrestling ==
Freestyle

Athlete	Event	Pools		Final	Rank
Athlete	Event	Groups	Rank	Final	Rank
Zsanett Nemeth	Girls' 70kg	Stankova (UKR); L Fall (0–3)	4	7th Place Match; Mohamed (EGY); W 2–0 (1–0, 3–0)	7
Zsanett Nemeth	Girls' 70kg	Yeats (CAN); L 0–2 (0–1, 0–4)	4	7th Place Match; Mohamed (EGY); W 2–0 (1–0, 3–0)	7
Zsanett Nemeth	Girls' 70kg	Kuenz (AUT); L Fall (0–7)	4	7th Place Match; Mohamed (EGY); W 2–0 (1–0, 3–0)	7

Greco-Roman

Athlete	Event	Pools		Final	Rank
Athlete	Event	Groups	Rank	Final	Rank
Adrian Kranitz	Boys' 58kg	Amatov (KGZ); L Fall (0–4)	3	5th Place Match; Camarillo (MEX); L 1–2 (0–1, 5–1, 4–7)	6
Adrian Kranitz	Boys' 58kg	Afrikaner (NAM); L Fall (0–4)	3	5th Place Match; Camarillo (MEX); L 1–2 (0–1, 5–1, 4–7)	6
