= Bosnia and Herzegovina at the 2010 Summer Youth Olympics =

- IOC code: BIH
- NOC: Olympic Committee of Bosnia and Herzegovina
- Website: www.okbih.ba

in Singapore
- Competitors: 5 in 4 sports
- Flag bearer: Damir Džumhur
- Medals Ranked 83rd: Gold 0 Silver 0 Bronze 1 Total 1

Summer Youth Olympics appearances (overview)
- 2010; 2014; 2018

Bosnia and Herzegovina participated in the 2010 Summer Youth Olympics in Singapore.

== Medalists ==
Medal	Name	Sport	Event	Date
Bronze	Damir Džumhur	Tennis	Boys' Singles	21 Aug
Bronze	Eldin Omerović	Judo	Mixed Team	25 Aug

== Athletics ==
=== Girls ===
Track and Road Events

Athletes	Event	Qualification		Final	
Athletes	Event	Result	Rank	Result	Rank
Melika Kasumović	Girls’ 100m	13.48	26 qD	13.86	27

== Judo ==
Individual

Athlete	Event	Round 1	Round 2	Round 3	Semifinals	Final	Rank
Athlete	Event	Opposition Result	Opposition Result	Opposition Result	Opposition Result	Opposition Result	Rank
Eldin Omerović	Boys' -81 kg	Greiter (AUT); L 000-010	Repechage; Shalabi (LBA); W 001-000	Repechage; Szakacs (SVK); L 000-100	did not advance		9
Milica Savić	Girls' -78 kg	BYE	Mansour (BEL); L 000-101		Repechage; Tuba (SRB); L 000-100	Did not advance	7

Team

Team	Event	Round 1	Round 2	Semifinals	Final	Rank
Team	Event	Opposition Result	Opposition Result	Opposition Result	Opposition Result	Rank
Cairo; Neha Thakur (IND); Mansurkhuja Muminkhujaev (UZB); Christine Huck (AUT); Ioan Visan (ROU); Andrea Guillen (CRC); Eldin Omerović (BIH); Barbara Matić (CRO); Pedro Pineda (VEN)	Mixed Team	Birmingham; W 5-2	Hamilton; W 4-4 (3-2)	Essen; L 2-5	Did not advance	Bronze medal
New York; Katelyn Bouyssou (USA); Dmytro Atanov (UKR); Julanda Bacaj (ALB); Matheus Marcia Machado (BRA); Dilara Incedayi (TUR); Ghenadie Pretivatii (MDA); Milica Savić (BIH); Mateja Glusac (SRB)	Mixed Team	BYE	Tokyo; L 4-4 (2-3)	did not advance		5

== Swimming ==
Athletes	Event	Heat		Semifinal		Final	
Athletes	Event	Time	Position	Time	Position	Time	Position
Zlatko Alić	100m Butterfly	57.46	24	Did not advance			
Zlatko Alić	200m Butterfly	2:08.71	18			Did not advance	

== Tennis ==
Singles

Athlete	Event	Round 1	Round 2	Quarterfinals	Semifinals	Final	Rank
Damir Džumhur	Boys' Singles	Uchiyama (JPN); W 2-0 (7-5, 6-2)	Biryukov (RUS); W 2-0 (6-4, 6-1)	Zsiga (HUN); W 2-0 (6-4, 6-3)	Bhambri (IND); L 1-2 (3-6, 6-4, 2-6)	Baluda (RUS); W 2-0 (7-5, 6-1)	Bronze medal

Doubles

Athlete	Event	Round 1	Quarterfinals	Semifinals	Final	Rank
Damir Džumhur (BIH); Mate Pavić (CRO)	Boys' Doubles	Bhambri (IND); Patrombon (PHI); W 2-1 (6-7, 7-5, [10-4])	Golding (GBR); Vesely (CZE); L 0-2 (6-7, 5-7)	Did not advance		
