= Tennis at the 2010 Summer Youth Olympics =

- Date: 15–21 August 2010
- Edition: 1st
- Category: Grade A
- Location: Kallang Tennis Centre

Champions

Boys' singles
- Juan Sebastián Gómez (COL)

Girls' singles
- Daria Gavrilova (RUS)

Boys' doubles
- (International Olympic Committee) Oliver Golding / Jiří Veselý (Mixed-NOCs)

Girls' doubles
- Tang Haochen / Zheng Saisai (CHN)
- Summer Youth Olympics

Tennis at the 2010 Summer Youth Olympics lasted from August 18 until August 25. For the Singles competitions, all matches were determined through a best-of-three tie-break sets. For the Doubles competitions, all matches were determined by two tie-break sets and a match tie-break game (10 points) in place of a third set. There were competitions for boys' singles, boys' doubles, girls' singles and girls' doubles. It took place at the Kallang Tennis Centre.

The acceptance lists for the event were released by the International Tennis Federation (ITF) on 29 June. 39 countries are represented in the event that involves both 32 players for the singles and 16 pairs for the doubles.

Each National Olympic Committee (NOC) could submit a maximum of 2 boys and 2 girls to compete in both the singles and doubles events. 12 places in the singles events were given out based on a player's junior world ranking. 16 places were given out based on ranking by region, with the remaining four positions allocated by the IOC or given to the next highest ranked player.

== Qualifiers ==
=== Boys' singles ===
| Player | NOC |
|---|---|
| Renzo Olivo | Argentina |
| Darian King | Barbados |
| Damir Džumhur | Bosnia and Herzegovina |
| Hugo Dellien | Bolivia |
| Tiago Fernandes | Brazil |
| Ouyang Bowen | China |
| Wang Chuhan | China |
| Huang Liang-chi | Chinese Taipei |
| Juan Sebastián Gómez | Colombia |
| Mate Pavić | Croatia |
| Jiří Veselý | Czech Republic |
| Roberto Quiroz | Ecuador |
| Kevin Krawietz | Germany |
| Peter Heller | Germany |
| Oliver Golding | Great Britain |
| Márton Fucsovics | Hungary |
| Máté Zsiga | Hungary |
| Yuki Bhambri | India |
| John Morrissey | Ireland |
| Alessandro Colella | Italy |
| Yasutaka Uchiyama | Japan |
| Stefan Micov | Macedonia |
| Alexis Carlos | Mexico |
| Diego Galeano | Paraguay |
| Duilio Beretta | Peru |
| Jeson Patrombon | Philippines |
| Victor Baluda | Russia |
| Mikhail Biryukov | Russia |
| Filip Horanský | Slovakia |
| Jozef Kovalík | Slovakia |
| Ahmed Triki | Tunisia |
| Ricardo Rodríguez | Venezuela |

=== Girls' singles ===
| Player | NOC |
|---|---|
| Agustína Sol Eskenazi | Argentina |
| An-Sophie Mestach | Belgium |
| Ilona Kremen | Belarus |
| Marianne Jodoin | Canada |
| Katarena Paliivets | Canada |
| Tang Haochen | China |
| Zheng Saisai | China |
| Denisa Allertová | Czech Republic |
| Mai Grage | Denmark |
| Anna-Lena Friedsam | Germany |
| Tímea Babos | Hungary |
| Grace Sari Ysidora | Indonesia |
| Sachie Ishizu | Japan |
| Emi Mutaguchi | Japan |
| Niriantsa Rasolomalala | Madagascar |
| Zarah Razafimahatratra | Madagascar |
| Mia Radulović | Montenegro |
| Verónica Cepede Royg | Paraguay |
| Monica Puig | Puerto Rico |
| Cristina Dinu | Romania |
| Daria Gavrilova | Russia |
| Yulia Putintseva | Russia |
| Doroteja Erić | Serbia |
| Stefanie Tan | Singapore |
| Jana Čepelová | Slovakia |
| Chantal Škamlová | Slovakia |
| Luksika Kumkhum | Thailand |
| Ons Jabeur | Tunisia |
| Sofiya Kovalets | Ukraine |
| Elina Svitolina | Ukraine |
| Andrea Gámiz | Venezuela |
| Adriana Pérez | Venezuela |

== Calendar ==
| August | 15 | 16 | 17 | 18 | 19 | 20 | 21 |
| Morning | 10.30 | 10.30 | 10.00 | 11:00 | | | |
| Afternoon | | | | | 14.30 | 14.30 | 15.00 |
|---|---|---|---|---|---|---|---|
| Boys' singles | Round of 32 | Round of 32 | Round of 16 | Quarterfinals | Semifinals | Bronze | Final |
| Girls' singles | Round of 32 | Round of 16 | Quarterfinals | Semifinals | Bronze | Final | |
| Boys' doubles | Round of 16 | Round of 16 | Quarterfinals | Semifinals | Bronze | Final | |
| Girls' doubles | | Round of 16 | Round of 16 | Quarterfinals | Semifinals | Bronze | Final |

== Medal summary ==
=== Medal table ===
| Rank | Nation | Gold | Silver | Bronze | Total |
|---|---|---|---|---|---|
| 1 | China | 1 | 1 | 0 | 2 |
| 1 | Russia | 1 | 1 | 0 | 2 |
| – | Mixed-NOCs | 1 | 0 | 1 | 2 |
| 3 | Colombia | 1 | 0 | 0 | 1 |
| 4 | Slovakia | 0 | 1 | 2 | 3 |
| 5 | India | 0 | 1 | 0 | 1 |
| 6 | Bosnia and Herzegovina | 0 | 0 | 1 | 1 |
| Totals (6 entries) | | 4 | 4 | 4 | 12 |

=== Events ===
| Event | Gold | Silver | Bronze |
|---|---|---|---|
| Boys' singles | Juan Sebastián Gómez (COL) | Yuki Bhambri (IND) | Damir Džumhur (BIH) |
| Boys' doubles | Oliver Golding (GBR) and Jiří Veselý (CZE) | Victor Baluda (RUS) and Mikhail Biryukov (RUS) | Filip Horanský (SVK) and Jozef Kovalík (SVK) |
| Girls' singles | Daria Gavrilova (RUS) | Zheng Saisai (CHN) | Jana Čepelová (SVK) |
| Girls' doubles | Tang Haochen (CHN) and Zheng Saisai (CHN) | Jana Čepelová (SVK) and Chantal Škamlová (SVK) | Tímea Babos (HUN) and An-Sophie Mestach (BEL) |
