= Great Britain at the 2010 Summer Youth Olympics =

- IOC code: GBR
- NOC: British Olympic Association
- Website: www.teamgb.com

in Singapore
- Competitors: 39 in 16 sports
- Flag bearer: David Bolarinwa
- Medals Ranked 17th: Gold 3 Silver 1 Bronze 5 Total 9

Summer Youth Olympics appearances (overview)
- 2010; 2014; 2018; 2026

Great Britain participated in the 2010 Summer Youth Olympics, the inaugural Youth Olympic Games, held in Singapore.

The British squad consisted of 40 athletes competing in 16 sports: aquatics (diving and swimming), archery, athletics, badminton, boxing, canoeing, equestrian, fencing, gymnastics, modern pentathlon, rowing, sailing, table tennis, taekwondo, tennis, and triathlon.

On 13 July 2010, the British Olympic Association announced their YOG squad with many well known names, including Tom Daley who competed for Great Britain at the 2008 Summer Olympics in Beijing, China and also won a world championship gold in Rome. Another well known name was Oliver Golding who reached the semi-finals of The Championships, Wimbledon in the boys singles of 2010.

== Individual medallists ==
Medal	Name	Sport	Event	Date
Gold	Jade Jones	Taekwondo	Women's 55 kg	17 Aug
Gold	Fiona Gammond; Georgia Howard-Merrill	Rowing	Junior women's pair	18 Aug
Gold	Carian Scudamore	Equestrian	Team jumping	20 Aug
Gold	Oliver Golding	Tennis	Boys' doubles	20 Aug
Gold	Sam Oldham	Gymnastics	Men's horizontal bar	22 Aug
Silver	Sam Oldham	Gymnastics	Men's pommel horse	21 Aug
Silver	David Bolarinwa	Athletics	Boys' medley relay	23 Aug
Bronze	Rachael Kelly	Swimming	Youth women's 100m butterfly	20 Aug
Bronze	Eleanor Faulkner	Swimming	Youth women's 400m freestyle	20 Aug
Bronze	David Bolarinwa	Athletics	Boys' 100 metres	21 Aug
Bronze	Charlie Grice	Athletics	Boys' 1000m	22 Aug
Bronze	Annie Tagoe	Athletics	Girls' medley relay	23 Aug
Bronze	Kieran Martin	Sailing	Boys' windsurfing (Techno 293)	25 Aug

== Archery ==
Boys

Athlete	Event	Ranking Round		Round of 32	Round of 16	Quarterfinals	Semifinals	Final	
Athlete	Event	Score	Seed	Opposition Score	Opposition Score	Opposition Score	Opposition Score	Opposition Score	Rank
Mark Nesbitt	Boys’ individual	638	3	Harikul (THA); W 7–3	Jaffar (SIN); L 4–6	Did not advance			9

Mixed Team

Athlete	Event	Partner	Round of 32	Round of 16	Quarterfinals	Semifinals	Final	
Athlete	Event	Partner	Opposition Score	Opposition Score	Opposition Score	Opposition Score	Opposition Score	Rank
Mark Nesbitt	Mixed Team	Beauty Ray (BAN)	Alarcón (ESP)/ Milon (BAN); L 4–6	Did not advance				17

== Athletics ==
=== Boys ===
Track and Road Events

Athletes	Event	Qualification		Final	
Athletes	Event	Result	Rank	Result	Rank
David Bolarinwa	Boys’ 100m	10.62	1 Q	10.51	Bronze medal
Charlie Grice	Boys’ 1000m	2:24.74	4 Q	2:21.85	Bronze medal
Themba Luhana	Boys’ 110m Hurdles	14.02	9 qB	13.78	9
Zak Seddon	Boys’ 2000m Steeplechase	DSQ qB		5:52.13	10
David Bolarinwa (GBR); Tomasz Kluczynski (POL); Marco Lorenzi (ITA); Nikita Uglov (RUS)	Boys’ medley relay			1:52.11	Silver medal

Field Events

Athletes	Event	Qualification		Final	
Athletes	Event	Result	Rank	Result	Rank
Andrew Elkins	Boys’ Hammer Throw	65.86	12 qB	67.77	10

=== Girls ===
Track and Road Events

Athletes	Event	Qualification		Final	
Athletes	Event	Result	Rank	Result	Rank
Annie Tagoe	Girls’ 100m	11.78	3 Q	11.73	4
Victoria Ohuruogu	Girls’ 400m	55.56	10 qB	55.99	11
Georgia Peel	Girls’ 1000m	2:45.78	2 Q	2:49.56	6
Abi Fitzpatrick	Girls’ 400m Hurdles	1:05.87	13 qB	1:05.61	14
Annie Tagoe (GBR); Anna Bongiorni (ITA); Sonja Mosler (GER); Bianca Răzor (ROU)	Girls’ medley relay			2:07.59	Bronze medal

Field Events

Athletes	Event	Qualification		Final	
Athletes	Event	Result	Rank	Result	Rank
Sophie McKinna	Girls’ Shot Put	14.30	5 Q	15.14	15
Freya Jones	Girls’ Javelin Throw	48.24	7 Q	49.56	5
Louisa James	Girls’ Hammer Throw	49.94	12 qB	53.21	10
Katie Byres	Girls’ Pole Vault	3.70	9 qB	4.00	8

== Badminton ==
Girls

Athlete	Event	Group Stage				Knock-Out Stage			
Athlete	Event	Match 1	Match 2	Match 3	Rank	Quarterfinal	Semifinal	Final	Rank
Sarah Milne	Girls’ Singles	Palermo (FRA) W 2–0 (21–11, 21–18)	Ketpura (USA) W 2–0 (21–19, 21–19)	Mathis (AUT) W 2–0 (21–11, 21–10)	1 Q	Wentholt (NED) W 2–0 (21–15, 21–8)	Deng (CHN) L 0–2 (12–21, 12–21)	Third Place Match; Vu (VIE) L 0–2 (15–21, 20–22)	4

== Boxing ==
Boys

Athlete	Event	Preliminaries	Semifinals	Final	Rank
Zack Davies	Bantamweight (54kg)		Shiva Thapa (IND); L 4–14	3rd Place Bout; Dawid Michelus (POL); L 7–12	4

== Canoeing ==
Boys

Athlete	Event	Time Trial		Round 1	Round 2 (Rep)	Round 3	Round 4	Round 5	Final
Athlete	Event	Time	Rank	Round 1	Round 2 (Rep)	Round 3	Round 4	Round 5	Final
Andrew Martin	Boys’ K1 slalom	1:35.74	7	Tsarykovich (BLR); W 1:34.23-1:43.89		Liebscher (GER); W 1:36.96-1:42.72	Brus (SLO); L 1:35.40-1:25.91	Did not advance	
Andrew Martin	Boys’ K1 sprint	1:51.63	21	Liebscher (GER); L 1:49.52-1:30.66	Moltaev (KGZ); L 1:52.26-1:41.52	Did not advance			

== Diving ==
Boys

Athlete	Event	Preliminary		Final	
Athlete	Event	Points	Rank	Points	Rank
Thomas Daley	Boys’ 3m Springboard	527.10	4 Q	514.35	9

Girls

Athlete	Event	Preliminary		Final	
Athlete	Event	Points	Rank	Points	Rank
Megan Sylvester	Girls’ 10m Platform	377.10	7 Q	351.60	10

== Equestrian ==
Athlete	Horse	Event	Round 1			Round 2			Total	Jump-Off		Rank
Athlete	Horse	Event	Penalties		Rank	Penalties		Rank	Total	Penalties	Time	Rank
Athlete	Horse	Event	Jump	Time	Rank	Jump	Time	Rank	Total	Penalties	Time	Rank
Martin Fuchs (SUI); Wojciech Dahlke (POL); Valentina Isoardi (ITA); Carian Scudamore (GBR); Nicola Philippaerts (BEL)	Midnight Mist; Travelling Soldior; Alloria Thomas; Mighty Mcgyver; Gippsland Girl	Team Jumping	0; ~~12~~; ~~28~~; 0; 4	0; ~~0~~; ~~0~~; 0; 0	1	0; 4; ~~16~~; 0; ~~4~~	0; 0; ~~0~~; 0; ~~0~~	2	8	0; 0; ~~24~~; 4; ~~DNS~~	45.30; 49.19; ~~54.92~~; 46.54; ~~DNS~~	Gold medal

== Fencing ==
Group Stage

Athlete	Event	Match 1	Match 2	Match 3	Match 4	Match 5	Seed
Alexander Tofalides	Boys’ Foil	Lichagin (RUS); L 4–5	Gyorgi (HUN); W 5–0	Lee (KOR); W 5–1	Mahmoud (EGY); L 2–5	Luperi (ITA); L 3–5	8
Amy Radford	Girls’ Épée	Matshaya (RSA); L 4–5	Tataran (ROU); L 4–5	Bakhareva (RUS); L 4–5	Lee (KOR); W 5–3	Tella (ARG); W 3–2	8

Knock-Out Stage

Athlete	Event	Round of 16	Quarterfinals	Semifinals	Final	Rank
Alexander Tofalides	Boys’ Foil	Mahmoud (EGY); W 15–9	Massialas (USA); L 12–15	Did not advance		7
Amy Radford	Girls’ Épée	Brunner (SUI); W 15–13	Lin (CHN); L 5–15	Did not advance		8

== Gymnastics ==
=== Artistic gymnastics ===
Boys

Athlete	Event	Floor		Pommel horse		Rings		Vault		Parallel bars		Horizontal bar		Total	
Athlete	Event	Score	Rank	Score	Rank	Score	Rank	Score	Rank	Score	Rank	Score	Rank	Score	Rank
Sam Oldham	Boys' qualification	14.350	4 Q	14.300	2 Q	13.900	10	15.600	10	14.250	4 Q	14.450	1 Q	86.850	2 Q
Sam Oldham	Boys' individual all-around	13.500	13	13.950	1	14.000	3	15.800	2	14.250	3	13.150	15	84.650	5

Athlete	Event	Score	Rank
Sam Oldham	Boys' floor	13.775	5
Sam Oldham	Boys' pommel horse	13.925	Silver medal
Sam Oldham	Boys' parallel bars	14.000	4
Sam Oldham	Boys' horizontal bar	14.375	Gold medal

Girls

Athlete	Event	Vault		Uneven Bars		Beam		Floor		Total	
Athlete	Event	Score	Rank	Score	Rank	Score	Rank	Score	Rank	Score	Rank
Jessica Hogg	Girls' qualification	13.500	14	11.600	25	12.900	16	13.250	6 Q	51.250	14 Q
Jessica Hogg	Girls' individual all-around	13.250	17	11.150	17	10.050	18	13.000	12	47.450	18

Athlete	Event	Score	Rank
Jessica Hogg	Girls' floor	13.600	5

=== Trampoline ===
Athlete	Event	Qualification				Final	
Athlete	Event	Routine 1	Routine 2	Total	Rank	Routine 1	Rank
Nathan Bailey	Boys' trampoline	26.700	38.000	64.700	5	12.000	8

== Modern pentathlon ==
Athlete	Event	Fencing (Épée one touch)			Swimming (200m freestyle)			Running & shooting (3000m, laser pistol)			Total points	Final rank
Athlete	Event	Results	Rank	Points	Time	Rank	Points	Time	Rank	Points	Total points	Final rank
Greg Longden	Boys' individual	7–16	21	640	2:09.99	12	1244	11:28.57	9	2248	4132	16
Alice Lencova (CZE); Greg Longden (GBR)	Mixed relay	39–53	19	750	2:04.66	10	1304	17:19.72	23	1924	3978	23

== Rowing ==
Athlete	Event	Heats		Repechage		Semifinals		Final		Overall rank
Athlete	Event	Time	Rank	Time	Rank	Time	Rank	Time	Rank	Overall rank
Ed Nainby-Luxmoore; Caspar Jopling	Boys' pair	3:13.96	1 QA/B			3:17.37	2 QA	3:09.47	4	4
Georgia Howard-Merrill; Fiona Gammond	Girls' pair	3:30.92	1 QA/B			3:41.03	3 QA	3:28.60	1	Gold medal

== Sailing ==
Windsurfing

Athlete	Event	Race											Points	Rank
Athlete	Event	1	2	3	4	5	6	7	8	9	10	M*	Points	Rank
Kieran Martin	Boys' Techno 293	1	2	8	3	1	~~10~~	3	3	4	6	1	32	Bronze medal
Jade Rogers	Girls' Techno 293	9	14	8	10	10	~~OCS~~	9	11	8	16	7	102	11

== Swimming ==
Athletes	Event	Heat		Semifinal		Final	
Athletes	Event	Time	Position	Time	Position	Time	Position
Eleanor Faulkner	Girls’ 100m freestyle	58.71	20	Did not advance			
Eleanor Faulkner	Girls’ 200m freestyle	2:04.44	9			Did not advance	
Eleanor Faulkner	Girls’ 400m freestyle	4:14.75	1 Q			4:14.31	Bronze medal
Eleanor Faulkner	Girls’ 100m butterfly	1:05.78	27	Did not advance			
Rachael Kelly	Girls’ 50m butterfly	28.14	6 Q	27.67	5 Q	27.77	7
Rachael Kelly	Girls’ 100m butterfly	1:01.30	7 Q	1:01.30	7 Q	1:00.26	Bronze medal
Rachael Kelly	Girls’ 200m butterfly	2:16.95	12			Did not advance	

== Table tennis ==
individual

Athlete	Event	Round 1		Round 2		Quarterfinals	Semifinals	Final	Rank
Athlete	Event	Group matches	Rank	Group matches	Rank	Quarterfinals	Semifinals	Final	Rank
Alice Loveridge	Girls' singles	Li (SIN); L 0–3 (12–14, 1–11, 3–11)	3 qB	Laid (ALG); W 3–0 (11–8, 11–8, 12–10)	1	Did not advance			17
Alice Loveridge	Girls' singles	Wu (NZL); W 3–0 (13–11, 11–9, 11–7)	3 qB	Cordero (PUR); W 3–1 (8–11, 11–9, 11–7, 15–13)	1	Did not advance			17
Alice Loveridge	Girls' singles	Tanioka (JPN); L 1–3 (11–9, 6–11, 4–11, 2–11)	3 qB	Giardi (SMR); W 3–0 (11–6, 11–5, 11–8)	1	Did not advance			17

Team

Athlete	Event	Round 1		Round 2	Quarterfinals	Semifinals	Final	Rank
Athlete	Event	Group matches	Rank	Round 2	Quarterfinals	Semifinals	Final	Rank
Europe 3 Alice Loveridge (GBR); Leonardo Mutti (ITA)	Mixed team	Africa 2 Ivoso (CGO); Kam (MRI); W 3–0 (3–0, 3–0, 3–1)	3 qB	Intercontinental 3 Phan (AUS); Mejía (ESA); W 2–0 (3–2, 3–0)	Pan America 2 Cordero (PUR); Saragovi (ARG); W 2–1 (2–3, 3–2, 3–1)	Did not advance		17
Europe 3 Alice Loveridge (GBR); Leonardo Mutti (ITA)	Mixed team	Europe 1 Szocs (ROU); Soderlund (SWE); L 1–2 (0–3, 3–2, 1–3)	3 qB	Intercontinental 3 Phan (AUS); Mejía (ESA); W 2–0 (3–2, 3–0)	Pan America 2 Cordero (PUR); Saragovi (ARG); W 2–1 (2–3, 3–2, 3–1)	Did not advance		17
Europe 3 Alice Loveridge (GBR); Leonardo Mutti (ITA)	Mixed team	Europe 4 Bliznet (MDA); Kulpa (POL); L 1–2 (0–3, 3–0, 1–3)	3 qB	Intercontinental 3 Phan (AUS); Mejía (ESA); W 2–0 (3–2, 3–0)	Pan America 2 Cordero (PUR); Saragovi (ARG); W 2–1 (2–3, 3–2, 3–1)	Did not advance		17

== Taekwondo ==
Athlete	Event	Preliminary	Quarterfinal	Semifinal	Final	Rank
Jade Jones	Girls' −55kg	Ruth Gbagbi (CIV); W 7–3	Monica Chavez (MEX); W 7–4	Jennifer Agren (SWE); W 4–0	Thanh Thao Nguyen (VIE); W 9–6	Gold medal

== Tennis ==
Singles

Athlete	Event	Round 1	Round 2	Quarterfinals	Semifinals	Final	Rank
Oliver Golding	Boys' Singles	Fucsovics (HUN); W 2–0 (7–5, 6–3)	Colella (ITA); W 2–0 (6–2, 6–1)	Gómez (COL); L 0–2 (4–6, 4–6)	Did not advance		

Doubles

Athlete	Event	Round 1	Quarterfinals	Semifinals	Final	Rank
Oliver Golding (GBR); Jiří Veselý (CZE)	Boys' Doubles	Ouyang (CHN); Wang (CHN); W 2–1 (6–3, 3–6, [10–6])	Džumhur (BIH); Pavić (CRO); W 2–0 (7–6, 7–5)	Galeano (PAR); Rodriguez (VEN); W 2–0 (6–3, 6–2)	Baluda (RUS); Biryukov (RUS); W 2–0 (6–3, 6–1)	Gold medal

== Triathlon ==
Girls

Triathlete	Event	Swimming	Transit 1	Cycling	Transit 2	Running	Total time	Rank
Elinor Thorogood	Individual	9:57	0:33	31:48	0:28	21:08	1:03:54.08	13

Men's

Athlete	Event	Swim (1.5 km)	Trans 1	Bike (40 km)	Trans 2	Run (10 km)	Total	Rank
Andrew Hood	Individual	9:06	0:32	29:36	0:23	17:40	57:17.54	15

Mixed

Athlete	Event	Total times per athlete (Swim 250 m, Bike 7 km, Run 1.7 km)	Total group time	Rank
Annie Thoren (SWE); Thomas Jurgens (BEL); Elinor Thorogood (GBR); Andrew Hood (GBR)	Mixed team relay Europe 4	21:11; 19:08; 22:04; 20:31	1:22:54.12	7

== TV coverage ==
The BBC will cover the youth olympic games with highlights on the red button updated at 8am and 3pm and the highlights will also be on the BBC iPlayer. CBBC programmes Newsround and Blue Peter will also be reporting from Singapore, while the BBC News and the BBC Sport websites will be covering all the big stories from each day.
