= Tennis at the 2010 Summer Youth Olympics – Boys' singles =

Boys' singles
- Tennis at the 2010 Summer Youth Olympics

Events
Singles	boys	girls
Doubles	boys	girls
- Summer Youth Olympics

These are the results for the boys' singles event at the 2010 Summer Youth Olympics.

== Seeds ==
1. Márton Fucsovics (HUN) (first round)
2. Damir Džumhur (BIH) (semifinals, Bronze Medallist)
3. Tiago Fernandes (BRA) (quarterfinals)
4. Duilio Beretta (PER) (second round)
5. Jiří Veselý (CZE) (second round)
6. Yuki Bhambri (IND) (finals, Silver Medallist)
7. Máté Zsiga (HUN) (quarterfinals)
8. Renzo Olivo (ARG) (first round)

== Main draw ==
=== Finals ===
Semifinals
Juan Sebastián Gómez (COL)	6	3	7
Victor Baluda (RUS)	1	6	5
6	Yuki Bhambri (IND)	6	4	6
2	Damir Džumhur (BIH)	3	6	2

Gold medal match
Juan Sebastián Gómez (COL)	6^{4}	7^{7}	4
6	Yuki Bhambri (IND)	7^{7}	6^{4}	1^{r}
Bronze medal match
Victor Baluda (RUS)	5	1
2	Damir Džumhur (BIH)	7	6

=== Top half ===
First round
1	Márton Fucsovics (HUN)	5	3
Oliver Golding (GBR)	7	6
NP	Diego Galeano (PAR)	7	2	3
Alessandro Colella (ITA)	5	6	6
Darian King (BAR)	3	2
Juan Sebastián Gómez (COL)	6	6
Roberto Quiroz (ECU)	0	6	3
5	Jiří Veselý (CZE)	6	3	6
3	Tiago Fernandes (BRA)	6	5	6
Peter Heller (GER)	1	7	4
NP	Stefan Micov (MKD)	5	1
Jozef Kovalík (SVK)	7	6
Victor Baluda (RUS)	7	6
Wang Chuhan (CHN)	5	2
Ricardo Rodríguez (VEN)	7^{7}	6
8	Renzo Olivo (ARG)	6^{4}	3

Second round
O Golding (GBR)	6	6
A Colella (ITA)	2	1
JS Gómez (COL)	7^{7}	7
5	J Veselý (CZE)	6^{5}	5
3	T Fernandes (BRA)	7^{7}	6
J Kovalík (SVK)	6^{3}	1
V Baluda (RUS)	6	4	6
R Rodríguez (VEN)	2	6	3

Quarterfinals
O Golding (GBR)	4	0
JS Gómez (COL)	6	6
3	T Fernandes (BRA)	2	6^{5}
V Baluda (RUS)	6	7^{7}

Semifinals
JS Gómez (COL)	6	3	7
V Baluda (RUS)	1	6	5

=== Bottom half ===
First round
6	Yuki Bhambri (IND)	6	6
Kevin Krawietz (GER)	3	0
Huang Liang-chi (TPE)	6	6
Pavel Krainik (CAN)	0	1
Diego Acosta (ECU)	5	1
John Morrissey (IRL)	7	6
Ahmed Triki (TUN)	4	4
4	Duilio Beretta (PER)	6	6
7	Máté Zsiga (HUN)	6	6
Filip Horanský (SVK)	3	2
Jeson Patrombon (PHI)	7^{11}	3	4
Ouyang Bowen (CHN)	6^{9}	6	6
Mate Pavić (CRO)	3	3
Mikhail Biryukov (RUS)	6	6
Yasutaka Uchiyama (JPN)	5	2
2	Damir Džumhur (BIH)	7	6

Second round
6	Y Bhambri (IND)	6	6
H Liang-chi (TPE)	2	4
J Morrissey (IRL)	6	7^{7}
4	D Beretta (PER)	2	6^{4}
7	M Zsiga (HUN)	6	6
O Bowen (CHN)	4	2
M Biryukov (RUS)	4	1
2	D Džumhur (BIH)	6	6

Quarterfinals
6	Y Bhambri (IND)	6	6
J Morrissey (IRL)	4	4
7	M Zsiga (HUN)	4	3
2	D Džumhur (BIH)	6	6

Semifinals
6	Y Bhambri (IND)	6	4	6
2	D Džumhur (BIH)	3	6	2

== Consolation draw ==
First round
1	Márton Fucsovics (HUN)	w/o
Pavel Krainik (CAN)
Stefan Micov (MKD)	7^{7}	5	[10]
Mate Pavić (CRO)	6^{3}	7	[7]
4	Yasutaka Uchiyama (JPN)	3	6	[4]
Diego Acosta (ECU)	6	4	[10]
Kevin Krawietz (GER)	7	0
Wang Chuhan (CHN)	5	0^{r}
Filip Horanský (SVK)	4	6	[10]
Diego Galeano (PAR)	6	4	[3]
Ahmed Triki (TUN)	1	6	[10]
3	Roberto Quiroz (ECU)	6	4	[6]
Peter Heller (GER)	6	6^{6}	[7]
Darian King (BAR)	4	7^{8}	[10]
Jeson Patrombon (PHI)
2	Renzo Olivo (ARG)	w/o

Quarterfinals
P Krainik (CAN)	3^{r}
S Micov (MKD)	4
D Acosta (ECU)	7	2	[10]
K Krawietz (GER)	5	6	[7]
F Horanský (SVK)	7^{7}	6
A Triki (TUN)	6^{2}	1
D King (BAR)	7^{10}	6
J Patrombon (PHI)	6^{8}	3

Semifinals
S Micov (MKD)	6^{2}	7^{7}	[10]
D Acosta (ECU)	7^{7}	6^{3}	[7]
F Horanský (SVK)	6	6^{2}	[6]
D King (BAR)	0	7^{7}	[10]

Final
S Micov (MKD)	5	2
D King (BAR)	7	6
