= Tennis at the 2010 Summer Youth Olympics – Boys' doubles =

Boys' doubles
- Tennis at the 2010 Summer Youth Olympics

Events
Singles	boys	girls
Doubles	boys	girls
← 2006 ·	Summer Youth Olympics	· 2014 →

These are the results for the boys' doubles event at the 2010 Summer Youth Olympics.

== Seeds ==
1. Márton Fucsovics (HUN) / Máté Zsiga (HUN) (quarterfinals)
2. Tiago Fernandes (BRA) / Renzo Olivo (ARG) (quarterfinals)
3. Duilio Beretta (PER) / Juan Sebastián Gómez (COL) (first round)
4. Damir Džumhur (BIH) / Mate Pavić (CRO) (quarterfinals)

== Draw ==
=== Final eight ===
Semifinals
Victor Baluda (RUS); Mikhail Biryukov (RUS)	6	7
Filip Horanský (SVK); Jozef Kovalík (SVK)	4	5
Oliver Golding (GBR); Jiří Veselý (CZE)	6	6
Diego Galeano (PAR); Ricardo Rodríguez (VEN)	3	2

Gold medal match
Victor Baluda (RUS); Mikhail Biryukov (RUS)	3	1
Oliver Golding (GBR); Jiří Veselý (CZE)	6	6
Bronze medal match
Filip Horanský (SVK); Jozef Kovalík (SVK)	7	6
Diego Galeano (PAR); Ricardo Rodríguez (VEN)	5	4

=== Top half ===
First round
1	Márton Fucsovics (HUN); Máté Zsiga (HUN)	6	6
Stefan Micov (MKD); Ahmed Triki (TUN)	4	2
Victor Baluda (RUS); Mikhail Biryukov (RUS)	6	6
Darian King (BAR); Pavel Krainik (CAN)	4	3
3	Duilio Beretta (PER); Juan Sebastián Gómez (COL)	0	6^{5}
Diego Acosta (ECU); Roberto Quiroz (ECU)	6	7^{7}
Alessandro Colella (ITA); John Morrissey (IRL)	2	5
Filip Horanský (SVK); Jozef Kovalík (SVK)	6	7

Quarterfinals
1	M Fucsovics (HUN); M Zsiga (HUN)	2	4
V Baluda (RUS); M Biryukov (RUS)	6	6
D Acosta (ECU); R Quiroz (ECU)	6^{6}	2
F Horanský (SVK); J Kovalík (SVK)	7^{8}	6

Semifinals
V Baluda (RUS); M Biryukov (RUS)	6	7
F Horanský (SVK); J Kovalík (SVK)	4	5

=== Bottom half ===
First round
Ouyang Bowen (CHN); Wang Chuhan (CHN)	3	6	[6]
Oliver Golding (GBR); Jiří Veselý (CZE)	6	3	[10]
Yuki Bhambri (IND); Jeson Patrombon (PHI)	7^{7}	5	[4]
4	Damir Džumhur (BIH); Mate Pavić (CRO)	6^{3}	7	[10]
Diego Galeano (PAR); Ricardo Rodríguez (VEN)	6	6
Huang Liang-chi (TPE); Yasutaka Uchiyama (JPN)	4	4
Peter Heller (GER); Kevin Krawietz (GER)	3	5
2	Tiago Fernandes (BRA); Renzo Olivo (ARG)	6	7

Quarterfinals
O Golding (GBR); J Veselý (CZE)	7^{7}	7
4	D Džumhur (BIH); M Pavić (CRO)	6^{3}	5
D Galeano (PAR); R Rodríguez (VEN)	6	6
2	T Fernandes (BRA); R Olivo (ARG)	4	4

Semifinals
O Golding (GBR); J Veselý (CZE)	6	6
D Galeano (PAR); R Rodríguez (VEN)	3	2
