= Athletics at the 2010 Summer Youth Olympics – Boys' discus throw =

Athletics – Boys' discus throw at the I Summer Youth Olympic Games
- Venue: Bishan Stadium
- Date: August 17–21
- Competitors: 14 from 14 nations

Medalists
1st place, gold medalist(s)		Jacques du Plessis	South Africa
2nd place, silver medalist(s)		Arjun Arjun	India
3rd place, bronze medalist(s)		Jaromír Mazgal	Czech Republic

The boys' discus throw competition at the 2010 Youth Olympic Games was held on 17–21 August 2010 in Bishan Stadium.

== Schedule ==
Date	Time	Round
17 August 2010	10:45	Qualification
21 August 2010	10:18	Final

== Results ==
=== Qualification ===
Rank	Athlete	1	2	3	4	Result	Notes	Q
1	Arjun Arjun (IND)	57.65	60.30	x	63.90	63.90	PB	FA
2	Jacques du Plessis (RSA)	x	57.50	63.17	60.48	63.17	PB	FA
3	Jaromir Mazgal (CZE)	55.53	56.96	56.20	58.93	58.93		FA
4	Jaka Žulič (SLO)	50.85	51;43	58.25	54.70	58.25	PB	FA
5	Mikko Torronen (FIN)	55.46	55.54	x	56.80	56.80		FA
6	Wojciech Praczyk (POL)	55.43	x	54.13	52.22	55.43		FA
7	Murat Gunduz (TUR)	51.21	54.49	55.26	x	55.26		FA
8	Petros Evangelakos (GRE)	41.35	x	54.57	x	54.57		FA
9	Yevgeniy Milovatskiy (KAZ)	x	54.15	53.27	x	54.15	PB	FB
10	Janos Kaplar (HUN)	53.67	x	50.40	x	53.67		FB
11	Daichi Nakamura (JPN)	x	51.17	52.84	49.16	52.84		FB
12	Fedrick Dacres (JAM)	51.48	52.69	x	x	52.69		FB
13	Lindon Kellon Toussaint (GRN)	38.75	50.59	x	51.61	51.61		FB
	Younes Kabil (MAR)	x	x	x	x	NM		FB

=== Finals ===
==== Final B ====
Rank	Athlete	1	2	3	4	Result	Notes
1	Janos Kaplar (HUN)	56.93	57.95	55.05	x	57.95	PB
2	Fedrick Dacres (JAM)	x	53.01	54.79	52.21	54.79	PB
3	Yevgeniy Milovatskiy (KAZ)	52.36	52.16	53.27	52.09	53.27	
4	Daichi Nakamura (JPN)	50.36	x	51.82	x	51.82	
5	Lindon Kellon Toussaint (GRN)	x	x	x	50.93	50.93	
6	Younes Kabil (MAR)	x	x	48.85	x	48.85	

==== Final A ====
Rank	Athlete	1	2	3	4	Result	Notes
1st place, gold medalist(s)	Jacques du Plessis (RSA)	61.33	63.94	63.76	61.56	63.94	PB
2nd place, silver medalist(s)	Arjun Arjun (IND)	53.99	55.90	62.52	x	62.52	
3rd place, bronze medalist(s)	Jaromir Mazgal (CZE)	52.95	x	51.85	60.31	60.31	
4	Petros Evangelakos (GRE)	56.14	58.00	58.37	55.84	58.37	PB
5	Jaka Žulič (SLO)	55.86	53.85	x	57.97	57.97	
6	Wojciech Praczyk (POL)	x	57.01	55.69	x	57.01	
7	Mikko Torronen (FIN)	55.37	55.36	55.88	56.03	56.03	
8	Murat Gunduz (TUR)	52.95	x	55.09	x	55.09	
