= Weightlifting at the 2010 Summer Youth Olympics – Girls' 48 kg =

The girls' 48 kg weightlifting event was the first women's event at the weightlifting competition at the 2010 Summer Youth Olympics, with competitors limited to a maximum of 48 kilograms of body mass. The whole competition took place on August 15 at 14:30.

Each lifter performed in both the snatch and clean and jerk lifts, with the final score being the sum of the lifter's best result in each. The athlete received three attempts in each of the two lifts; the score for the lift was the heaviest weight successfully lifted.

== Medalists ==
Gold	Tian Yuan; China	190 kg
Silver	Sirivimon Pramongkhol; Thailand	163 kg
Bronze	Genesis Rodriguez; Venezuela	154 kg

== Results ==
Rank	Name	Group	Body Weight	Snatch (kg)				Clean & Jerk (kg)				Total (kg)
Rank	Name	Group	Body Weight	1	2	3	Res	1	2	3	Res	Total (kg)
1st place, gold medalist(s)	Tian Yuan (CHN)	A	47.82	75	80	85	85	95	100	105	105	190
2nd place, silver medalist(s)	Sirivimon Pramongkhol (THA)	A	47.04	65	68	~~70~~	68	89	95	~~100~~	95	163
3rd place, bronze medalist(s)	Genesis Rodriguez (VEN)	A	47.57	67	70	71	71	81	83	~~87~~	83	154
4	Thi Hong Nguyen (VIE)	A	45.82	65	~~70~~	70	70	75	81	~~87~~	81	151
5	Santoshi Matsa (IND)	A	47.84	~~62~~	62	65	65	80	~~85~~	85	85	150
6	Atenery Hernandez (ESP)	A	47.93	60	63	~~65~~	63	73	76	~~78~~	76	139
7	Kay Khine Khine (MYA)	A	45.33	50	55	~~58~~	55	65	~~70~~	~~70~~	65	120
8	Lilla Berki (HUN)	A	46.03	40	43	46	46	53	57	~~60~~	57	103
