= Judo at the 2010 Summer Youth Olympics – Girls' 44 kg =

Judo competition

The Girls' 44 kg tournament in Judo at the 2010 Summer Youth Olympics was held on August 21 at the International Convention Centre.

This event was the lightest of the girl's judo weight classes, limiting competitors to a maximum of 44 kilograms of body mass. The tournament bracket consisted of a single-elimination contest culminating in a gold medal match. There was also a repechage to determine the winners of the two bronze medals. Each judoka who had lost before the finals competed in the repechage with the two finalists getting bronze medals.

== Medalists ==
Gold	Seul Bi Bae; South Korea
Silver	Barbara Batizi; Hungary
Bronze	Sothea Sam; Cambodia
Bronze	Vita Valnova; Belarus

== Results ==
=== Main Bracket ===
Round of 16
Dieulourdes Joseph (HAI)	000
Yoana Damyanova (BUL)	101

Quarterfinals
Seul Bi Bae (KOR)	101
Yoana Damyanova (BUL)	000
Lesly Cano (PER)	020
Neha Thakur (IND)	000
Barbara Batizi (HUN)	101
Vita Valnova (BLR)	000
Cynthia Rahming (BAH)	000
Sothea Sam (CAM)	012

Semifinals
Seul Bi Bae (KOR)	100
Lesley Cano (PER)	000
Barbara Batizi (HUN)	020
Sothea Sam (CAM)	000

Finals
Seul Bi Bae (KOR)	011
Barbara Batizi (HUN)	000

=== Repechage ===
First round
Dieulourdes Joseph (HAI)	BYE

Second round
Dieulourdes Joseph (HAI)	000
Neha Thakur (IND)	101
Yoana Damyanova (BUL)	BYE
Cynthia Rahming (BAH)	BYE
Vita Valnova (BLR)	BYE

Third round
Neha Thakur (IND)	000
Yoana Damyanova (BUL)	021
Cynthia Rahming (BAH)	000
Vita Valnova (BLR)	100

Bronze Medal Finals
Yoana Damyanova (BUL)	000
Sothea Sam (CAM)	100
Vita Valnova (BLR)	001
Lesly Cano (PER)	000
