= Boxing at the 2010 Summer Youth Olympics – Men's 57 kg =

Boxing competitions

These are the results of the Men's Feather 57 kg competition in boxing at the 2010 Summer Youth Olympics in Singapore. Preliminaries were held on August 21, semifinals on August 22, 5th place bout on August 23, the bronze medal bout on August 24 and the Final bout on August 25. Unlike world championships and the Olympic Games, only one bronze medal is awarded.

== Medalists ==
Artur Bril
Germany
Elvin Isayev
Azerbaijan
Fradimil Macayo
Venezuela

== Results ==
Preliminaries
Anand Dashdorj (MGL) | 2
Elvin Isayev (AZE) | 13
Jakub Chval (CZE) | 2
Fradimil Macayo (VEN) | 15

Semifinals
Denislav Suslekov (BUL) | 2
Artur Bril (GER) | 2
Elvin Isayev (AZE) | 10
Fradimil Macayo (VEN) | 6

Final
Artur Bril (GER) | 11
Elvin Isayev (AZE) | 4
Third place
Denislav Suslekov (BUL) | 3
Fradimil Macayo (VEN) | 8

| 5th place bout |
| Anand Dashdorj (MGL) | 12 |
| Jakub Chval (CZE) | 6 |
