= India at the 2010 Summer Youth Olympics =

- IOC code: IND
- NOC: Indian Olympic Association

in Singapore
- Competitors: 32 in 13 sports
- Flag bearer: Yuki Bhambri
- Medals Ranked 58th: Gold 0 Silver 6 Bronze 2 Total 8

Summer Youth Olympics appearances (overview)
- 2010; 2014; 2018

India participated in the 2010 Summer Youth Olympics in Singapore.

The Indian squad comprised 32 athletes competing in 13 sports: aquatics (swimming), archery, athletics, badminton, basketball, boxing, judo, rowing, shooting, table tennis, tennis, weightlifting and wrestling.

== Medalists ==
Medals awarded to participants of Mixed-NOC teams are represented in (italics). These medals are not counted towards the Individual NOC Medal tally.

Medal	Name	Sport	Event	Date
Silver	Pooja Dhanda	Wrestling	Girls' Freestyle 60kg	16 Aug
Silver	Prannoy Kumar	Badminton	Boys' Singles	19 Aug
Silver	Yuki Bhambri	Tennis	Boys' Singles	21 Aug
Silver	Arjun Arjun	Athletics	Boys' Discus throw	21 Aug
Silver	Kumar Durgesh	Athletics	Boys' 400m hurdles	23 Aug
Silver	Shiva Thapa	Boxing	Men's Bantam 54kg	25 Aug
Bronze	Satywart Kadian	Wrestling	Boys' Freestyle 100kg	17 Aug
Bronze	Vikas Krishan Yadav	Boxing	Men's Light 60kg	24 Aug
Bronze	Neha Thakur	Judo	Mixed team	25 Aug

== Archery ==
Athlete	Event	Ranking Round		Round of 32	Round of 16	Quarterfinals	Semifinals	Final	
Athlete	Event	Score	Seed	Opposition Score	Opposition Score	Opposition Score	Opposition Score	Opposition Score	Rank
Atanu Das	Boys' Individual	637	5	Hautamaki (FIN); L 5–6	Did not advance				17
Seema Verma	Girls' Individual	635	5	Sorsa (FIN); W 6–0	Gobbels (BEL); L 3–7	Did not advance			9
Miranda Leek (USA); Atanu Das (IND)	Mixed Team	1187	24	Custers (NED); Shahnazaryan (ARM); L 4–6	Did not advance				17
Seema Verma (IND); Sebastian Linster (HUN)	Mixed Team	1194	21	Wojnicka (POL); Yılmaz (TUR); L 2–6	Did not advance				17

== Athletics ==
=== Boys ===
Track and Road Events

Athletes	Event	Qualification		Final	
Athletes	Event	Result	Rank	Result	Rank
Indrajeet Patel	Boys' 3000m	8:15.02	9 Q	8:36.73	11
Kumar Durgesh	Boys’ 400m Hurdles	52.20	2 Q	50.81	Silver medal
Kuldeep Kumar	Boys' 10 km Walk	—N/a		DNF	

Field Events

Athletes	Event	Qualification		Final	
Athletes	Event	Result	Rank	Result	Rank
Arjun Kumar	Boys' Discus Throw	63.90	1 Q	62.52	Silver medal

=== Girls ===
Track and Road Events

Athletes	Event	Qualification		Final	
Athletes	Event	Result	Rank	Result	Rank
Khushbir Kaur	Girls' 5 km Walk	—N/a		25:30.27	13

== Badminton ==
Boys

Athlete	Event	Group stage				Quarterfinal	Semifinal	Final / BM	
Athlete	Event	Opposition Score	Opposition Score	Opposition Score	Rank	Opposition Score	Opposition Score	Opposition Score	Rank
Prannoy Kumar	Boys' Singles	Claerbout (FRA); W (21–15, 21–14)	Coke (JAM); W (21–9, 21–10)	Keophiachan (LAO); W (21–11, 21–12)	1 Q	Hsieh F-t (TPE); W (21–13, 18–21, 24–22)	Kang J-w (KOR); W (19–21, 21–17, 21–17)	Poodchalat (THA); L (15–21, 16–21)	2nd place, silver medalist(s)
B. Sai Praneeth	Boys' Singles	Huang C (SIN); L (12–21, 21–18, 17–21)	Richardson (NZL); W (21–12, 21–12)	Cuba (PER); W (21–12, 21–12)	2	did not advance			

== Basketball ==
Boys

Squad list	Event	Group stage					Placement stage			
Squad list	Event	Opposition Score	Opposition Score	Opposition Score	Opposition Score	Rank	Opposition Score	Opposition Score	Opposition Score	Rank
Shyam Sunder (C); Kirti Goswani; Amit Kannarjee; Sukhjeet	Boys' Basketball	Puerto Rico; L 15–33	Serbia; L 19–33	Greece; L 20–33	New Zealand; L 12–17	5	Panama; W 28–12	South Africa; W 27–11	Singapore; L 20–31	18

== Boxing ==
Boys

Athlete	Event	Preliminaries	Semifinals	Final	
Athlete	Event	Opposition Result	Opposition Result	Opposition Result	Rank
Shiva Thapa	Bantamweight (54kg)	Bye	Davies (GBR); W 14–4	Ramirez (CUB); L 2–5	2nd place, silver medalist(s)
Vikas Krishan Yadav	Lightweight (60kg)	Matevosyan (ARM); W 7–2	Petrauskas (LTU); L 3–4	Echeverria (MEX); W DSQ	3rd place, bronze medalist(s)

== Judo ==
Individual

Athlete	Event	Round of 16	Quarterfinals	Semifinals	Repechage 1	Repechage 2	Final / BM	
Athlete	Event	Opposition Result	Opposition Result	Opposition Result	Opposition Result	Opposition Result	Opposition Result	Rank
Subash Yadav	Boys' -55 kg	Bye	Bauro (FIJ); W 110–000	Muminkhujaev (UZB); L 000–003	Bye		Atanov (UKR); L 000–100	5
Neha Thakur	Girls' -44 kg	Bye	Cano (PER); L 000–020	Did not advance	Joseph (HAI); W 101–000	Damyanova (BUL); L 000–021	Did not advance	7
Subash Yadav (Team Barcelona)	Mixed Team	Osaka; L 3–5	Did not advance		—N/a		Did not advance	9
Neha Thakur (Team Cairo)	Mixed Team	Birmingham; W 5–2	Hamilton; W 4–4 (3–2)	Essen; L 2–5	—N/a		Did not advance	3rd place, bronze medalist(s)

== Rowing ==
Athlete	Event	Heats		Repechage		Semifinals		Final		Overall Rank
Athlete	Event	Time	Rank	Time	Rank	Time	Rank	Time	Rank	Overall Rank
Yasin Khan; Gurpreet Singh	Boys' Pair	3:18.86	5 QR	3:29.47	3 QA/B	3:24.64	5 QB	3:18.40	5	11
Nimmy Thomas; Mitali Sekhar Deo	Girls' Pair	3:49.69	4 QR	4:00.27	2 QA/B	4:02.77	6 QB	3:50.92	5	11

== Shooting ==
Athlete	Event	Qualification		Final		
Athlete	Event	Points	Rank	Points	Total	Rank
Navdeep Singh Rathore	Boys' 10m Air Rifle	587 (46.5)	8 Q	98.5	685.5	8
Neha Milind Sapte	Girls' 10m Air Rifle	392	7 Q	103.7	495.7	5
Ruchi Singh	Girls' 10m Air Pistol	374	6 Q	93.2	467.2	6

== Swimming ==
Athletes	Event	Heat		Semifinal		Final	
Athletes	Event	Time	Position	Time	Position	Time	Position
Aaron D'Souza	Boys’ 100m Freestyle	51.76	12 Q	51.49	10	Did not advance	
Aaron D'Souza	Boys’ 200m Freestyle	1:53.35	15	—N/a		Did not advance	
Arhatha Magavi	Girls’ 100m Freestyle	1:05.18	48	Did not advance			
Arhatha Magavi	Girls’ 100m Butterfly	1:09.35	30	Did not advance			
Arhatha Magavi	Girls’ 200m Butterfly	2:32.91	21	—N/a		Did not advance	

== Table tennis ==
Athlete	Event	Round 1				Round 2				Quarterfinals	Semifinals	Final	
Athlete	Event	Opposition Result	Opposition Result	Opposition Result	Rank	Opposition Result	Opposition Result	Opposition Result	Rank	Opposition Result	Opposition Result	Opposition Result	Rank
Avik Das	Boys' Singles	Vanrossomme (BEL); L 0–3	Leitgeb (AUT); L 0–3	Mutti (ITA); L 1–3	4 qB	Gavilan (PAR); L 2–3	Holikov (UZB); L 2–3	Mejia (ESA); L 1–3	4	Did not advance			29
Mallika Bhandarkar	Girls' Singles	Gu Yt (CHN); L 0–3	Kim S-i (PRK); L 0–3	—N/a	3 qB	Ivoso (CGO); W 3–0	Nagyvaradi (HUN); L 2–3	—N/a	2	Did not advance			21
Mallika Bhandarkar; Avik Das	Mixed Team	Ng KY / Chiu CH (HKG); L 0–3	Vithanage / Marakkala (SRI); W 3–0	Sawettabut / Santiwattanatarm (THA); L 1–2	3 qB	Wu / Wu (NZL); W 2–1	Giardi (SMR) / Massah (MAW); W 2–0	—N/a		Did not advance			17

== Tennis ==
Singles

Athlete	Event	Round of 32	Round of 16	Quarterfinals	Semifinals	Final / BM	
Athlete	Event	Opposition Result	Opposition Result	Opposition Result	Opposition Result	Opposition Result	Rank
Yuki Bhambri	Boys' Singles	Krawietz (GER); W 6–3, 6–0	Huang L-c (TPE); W 6–2, 6–4	Morrissey (IRL); W 6–4, 6–4	Džumhur (BIH); W 6–3, 4–6, 6–2	Gómez (COL); L 7–6, 6–7, 1–4^{RET}	2nd place, silver medalist(s)
Yuki Bhambri (IND); Jeson Patrombon (PHI)	Boys' Doubles	—N/a	Džumhur (BIH); Pavić (CRO); L 7–6, 5–7, [4–10]	Did not advance			

== Weightlifting ==
Athlete	Event	Snatch	Clean & jerk	Total	Rank
Santoshi Matsa	Girls' 48kg	65	85	150	5

== Wrestling ==
Freestyle

Athlete	Event	Group stage				Final / RM	Rank
Athlete	Event	Opposition Score	Opposition Score	Opposition Score	Rank	Opposition Score	Rank
Satywart Kadian	Boys' 100kg	Dhesi (CAN); W 2–0	Conyedo (CUB); L 0–2	Schutte (RSA); W 2–1	2	Petriashvili (GEO); W 2–0	3rd place, bronze medalist(s)
Pooja Dhanda	Girls' 60kg	Burkert (USA); W 2–0	Puteri (SIN); W Fall	Ahmed (BUL); W 2–0	1	Battsetseg (MGL); L 1–2	2nd place, silver medalist(s)
