= Matěj Lasák =

Czech cyclist

Personal information
- Born: 1 May 1992 (age 34) Prague, Czechoslovakia

Cycling career
- Sport: Cycling
- Discipline: Cyclo-cross
- Role: Rider

Matěj Lasák (born 1 May 1992) is a Czech male cyclo-cross cyclist. He represented his nation in the men's elite event at the 2016 UCI Cyclo-cross World Championships in Heusden-Zolder.
