= Oliver Golding =

Former child actor, junior tennis player

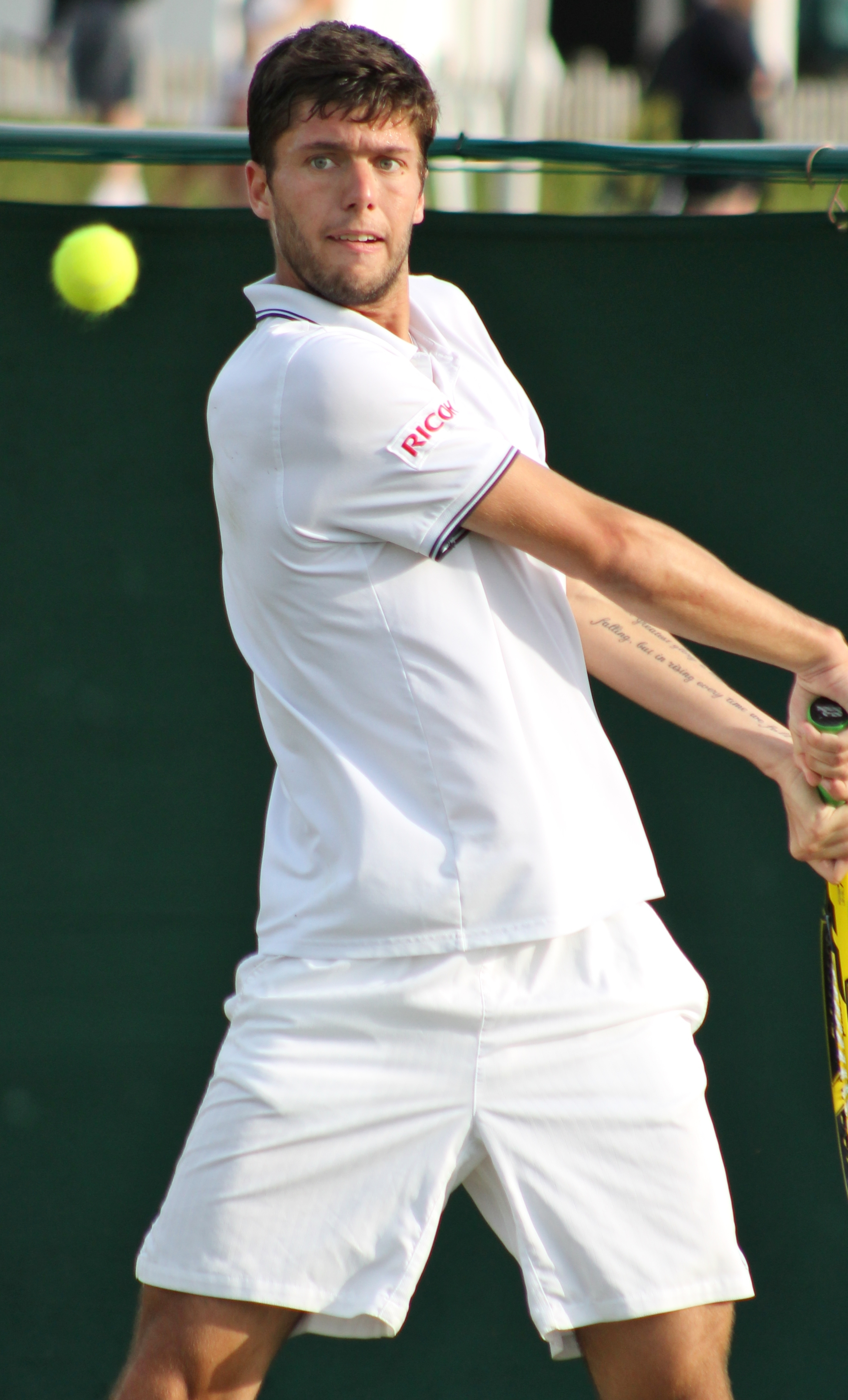
- Oliver Golding in 2014
- Full name: Oliver Golding
- Country (sports): United Kingdom
- Residence: Richmond, London, England
- Born: 29 September 1993 (age 33) Richmond, London, England
- Height: 6 ft 2.75 in (1.8987 m)
- Turned pro: 2011
- Retired: Sep 2017 (last match played)
- Plays: Right-handed (two-handed backhand)
- Prize money: $99,692

Singles
- Career record: 0–3
- Career titles: 0
- Highest ranking: No. 327 (28 April 2014)

Grand Slam singles results
- Wimbledon: 1R (2012)

Doubles
- Career record: 0–1
- Career titles: 0
- Highest ranking: No. 409 (27 August 2012)

Grand Slam doubles results
- Wimbledon: 1R (2012)
- Last updated on: 1 January 2019.

Medal record

Men's tennis

Representing a mixed-NOCs team

Youth Olympic Games
Gold medal – first place	2010 Singapore	Doubles

Oliver Golding (born 29 September 1993) is a British former professional tennis player and child actor. Golding is a Youth Olympic Games gold medallist, having won gold in the boys' doubles event in tennis at the 2010 Summer Youth Olympics with Czech partner Jiří Veselý, with whom he also reached the final in the boys' doubles at the 2010 U.S. Open.

Showing promise in reaching a world junior ranking of number two and being the 2011 U.S. Open Boys' Champion, Golding failed to transition onto the men's professional circuit, never entering the top 300 and failing to win a match on the ATP tour.

== Tennis ==
=== Early career ===
In 2004, Golding began playing tennis for the Esporta Riverside Club, Chiswick, and later that year went to Wimbledon, under the Lawn Tennis Association's "Ariel Champions of the Future" scheme, to meet former professionals Martina Navratilova and Todd Woodbridge.

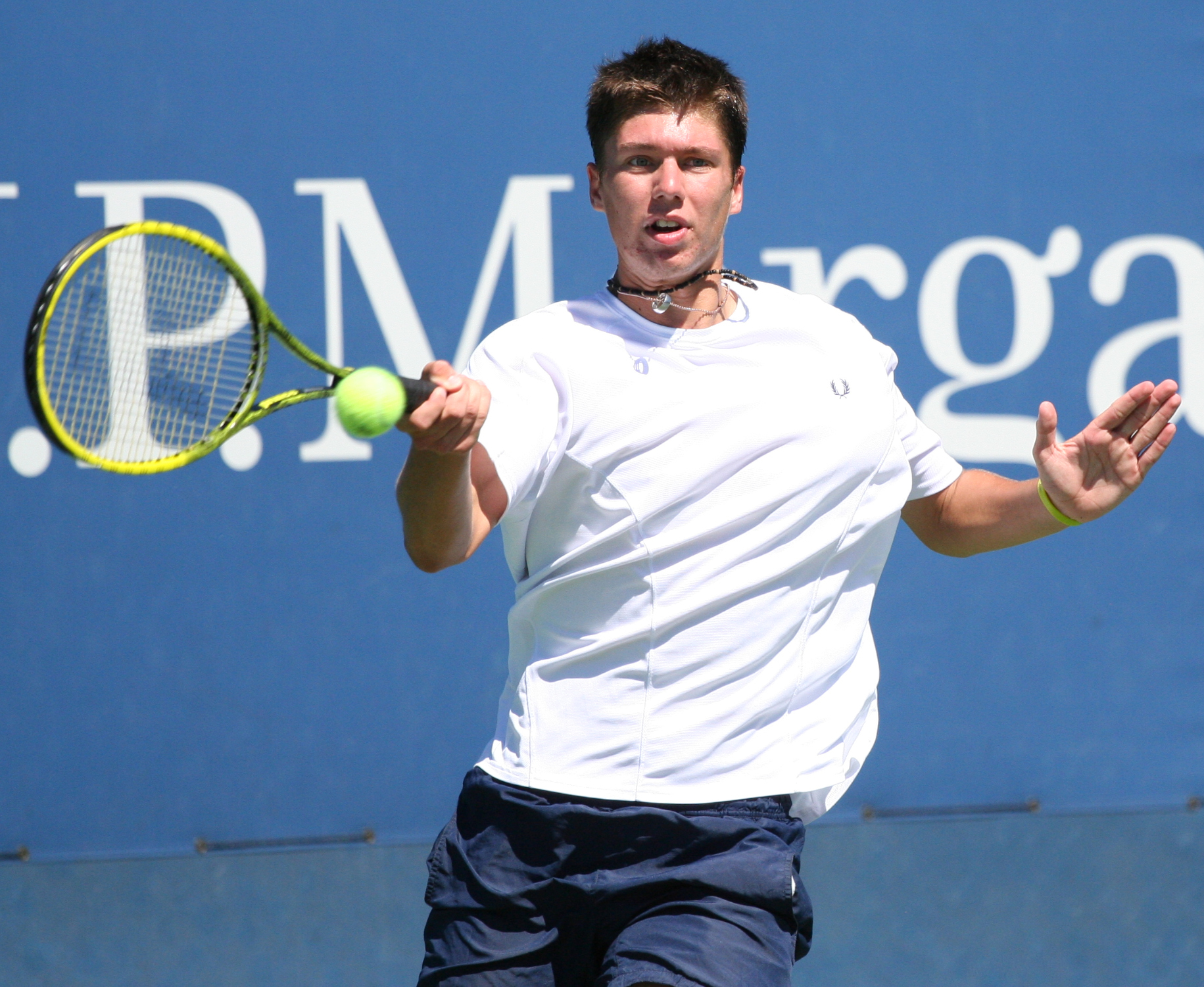
Oliver Golding in action during the 2010 US Open

On 27 November 2005, in the first ever Aberdeen Cup tennis match, Golding was selected to represent England in one of the junior matches, beating Scotland's Scott Lister 11 games to 4 in their "tie-break" style rubber, to square the match however, Jamie Murray and Elena Baltacha won their subsequent doubles game, to secure a Scottish victory. It was claimed on the Guardian Unlimited website that Golding had "impressed Andy Murray when he played for England against Scotland".

In late 2006, as fourth seed, Golding lost 4–6, 2–6, in the semi-final of the Ariel Winter Grand Prix event (promoted by the LTA), to the eventual winner, number two seed Andrew Bettles.

Golding's first two tournament wins were in the Bournemouth Open (Boys 14) at the West Hants Club on 5 August 2007, when he defeated David Wright 6–3, 6–0 in the Final, and in the Frutina Westway Winter Tournament (16 & Under) on 31 December 2007, when he beat Alexander Wilton 6–0, 6–0 in that Final match. Golding was also the recipient of a £2,000 grant from "Tennis First", a charity set up to help young players fulfil their potential, and tennis kit from the manufacturers Fred Perry. Subsequently, on 5 April 2008, Golding beat Zack Evenden 6–3, 6–1 to win the Rickmansworth Junior Tournament (18 & Under Boys Singles).

Golding won his first ITF tournament in July 2008 at the Grade 5 Scottish International ITF doubles competition, partnering Nick Jones. He became the British junior No. 1 in late 2009. In 2010 he reached the semifinals in the junior boys singles at Wimbledon, beating the world Number No. 1 Jason Kubler en route.

At the Youth Olympics Golding beat world No. 1 and Junior Wimbledon champion Márton Fucsovics in round 1 of the singles, and won gold in the boys' doubles with Czech partner Jiří Veselý. This moved him into the top 20 of the ITF boys' world rankings. At the 2010 US Open Golding once again teamed up with Jiří Veselý in the boys' doubles. They reached the final where they lost 6–1, 7–5.

In September 2011, Golding won the US Open boys' singles, reaching as high as No. 2 in the junior combined rankings as a result.

==== Junior performance timelines ====
Key
W	F	SF	QF	#R	RR	Q#	DNQ	A	NH

(W) winner; (F) finalist; (SF) semifinalist; (QF) quarterfinalist; (#R) rounds 4, 3, 2, 1; (RR) round-robin stage; (Q#) qualification round; (DNQ) did not qualify; (A) absent; (NH) not held; (SR) strike rate (events won / competed); (W–L) win–loss record.

===== Singles =====
Tournament	2009	2010	2011	W–L
Grand Slam tournaments
Australian Open	A	3R	A	2–1
French Open	A	2R	QF	4–2
Wimbledon	1R	SF	2R	5–3
US Open	A	2R	W	7–1
Win–loss	0–1	8–4	10–2	
Youth Olympic Games
Summer Youth Olympics	NH	QF	NH	2–1

===== Doubles =====
Tournament	2009	2010	2011	W–L
Grand Slam tournaments
Australian Open	A	1R	A	0–1
French Open	A	QF	QF	4–2
Wimbledon	1R	1R	F	4–3
US Open	1R	F	QF	6–3
Win–loss	0–2	5–4	8–3	
Youth Olympic Games
Summer Youth Olympics	NH	W	NH	4–0

=== 2011 ===
Golding was given a wildcard to play at the Aegon Championships in London but lost in the first round to 2007 finalist Nicolas Mahut in his first non-junior event.

At the French Open Golding was a Boys' Singles quarterfinalist. He was defeated by Bjorn Fratangelo 1–6, 1–6. Golding also reached the quarterfinals of the Boys' doubles at the French Open, partnered with Jiří Veselý, they lost to Mitchell Krueger and Shane Vinsant of the US in 4–6, 6–4, 8–10.

At the Wimbledon Championships Golding reached the Final of the boys' doubles, partnered with Jiří Veselý, where they lost to George Morgan & Mate Pavić in 3 sets 6–3, 4–6, 5–7. Golding reached the second round of the boys' singles.

Golding partnered Liam Broady at the boys' doubles at the 2011 U.S. Open, being beaten by R. Kern and J. Lenz, 6–7 (4–7), 4–6 of Germany in the quarterfinals. In the boys' Singles at the 2011 U.S. Open Golding won the final by defeating Jiří Veselý 5–7, 6–3, 6–4.

Golding finished the 2011 season with an ITF Junior Boys' Rankings world ranking of 3; his highest season ranking was 2.

=== 2012 ===
Through 2012, Golding mainly played on the Futures tour, winning two tournaments and losing one further final as of September 2012. Golding made his ATP Tour debut at the 2012 Aegon Championships and his grand slam debut at Wimbledon, losing both matches.

=== 2014 ===
In August 2014, Golding announced that he was "taking a break" from tour tennis, as he felt he had just been "going through the motions", partly due to his feelings about the reduction in the Lawn Tennis Association's bonus scheme and the closure of the high-performance programme at the National Tennis Centre in Richmond, very near his home. He stated that he felt he would have to relocate to France to continue in top-class tennis, because of a shortage of high quality training locations in the UK. However, he found that he was unwilling to do this, due to his dislike of travelling. As of 2015, Golding was a former tennis player helping out at his mother's tennis coaching school.

=== 2017 ===
Golding made a brief comeback in August when he came through qualifying to win an ITF Futures tournament in Italy defeating Davide Galoppini in the final 7–6 6–3. In the first round he knocked out the number one seed Yaraslav Shyla (298) 6–2 7–6. He followed this by reaching the final of his next futures event in Nottingham.

Golding admitted to being approached by Alexandros Jakupovic to throw a match.

== Challengers and Futures finals ==
=== Singles: 12 (6 titles, 6 runner-ups) ===
Legend (singles) ATP Challenger Tour (0–0) ITF Futures Tour (6–6)	Titles by surface Hard (4–3) Clay (2–3) Grass (0–0)

Result	W–L	Date	Tournament	Tier	Surface	Opponent	Score
Win	1–0	Apr 2012	Great Britain F6, Bournemouth	Futures	Clay	(United Kingdom) Andrew Fitzpatrick	7–6^{(7–4)}, 6–4
Win	2–0	May 2012	Great Britain F8, Newcastle	Futures	Clay	(United Kingdom) Daniel Smethurst	6–4, 6–1
Loss	2–1	Aug 2012	Netherlands F5, Enschede	Futures	Clay	(United Kingdom) Alexander Slabinsky	7–6^{(7–5)}, 3–6, 4–6
Loss	2–2	Oct 2012	Qatar F2, Doha	Futures	Hard	(France) Clément Reix	3–6, 4–6
Loss	2–3	Jun 2013	Spain F15, Madrid	Futures	Clay	(Germany) Richard Becker	3–6, 2–6
Loss	2–4	Aug 2013	Austria F6, Wels	Futures	Clay	(Austria) Dennis Novak	2–6, 7–6^{(7–2)}, 6–7^{(1–7)}
Win	3–4	Nov 2013	Greece F19, Heraklion	Futures	Hard	(United Kingdom) Luke Bambridge	1–6, 6–2, 6–3
Win	4–4	Nov 2013	Greece F20, Rethymno	Futures	Hard	(Serbia) Nikola Čačić	6–4, 7–6^{(7–4)}
Win	5–4	Feb 2014	Portugal F1, Vale do Lobo	Futures	Hard	(Russia) Stanislav Vovk	6–1, 6–3
Loss	5–5	Apr 2014	Qatar F2, Doha	Futures	Hard	(Switzerland) Adrien Bossel	4–6, 1–6
Win	6–5	Sep 2017	Italy F27, Piombino	Futures	Hard	(Italy) Davide Galoppini	7–6^{(7–3)}, 6–3
Loss	6–6	Sep 2017	Great Britain F4, Nottingham	Futures	Hard	(United Kingdom) Lloyd Glasspool	7–5, 4–6, 4–6

=== Doubles: 15 (9 titles, 6 runner-ups) ===
Legend (doubles) ATP Challenger Tour (0–0) ITF Futures Tour (9–6)	Titles by surface Hard (7–4) Clay (2–2) Grass (0–0)

Result	W–L	Date	Tournament	Tier	Surface	Partner	Opponents	Score
Loss	0–1	Aug 2010	Great Britain F12, Roehampton	Futures	Hard	(United Kingdom) Neal Skupski	(United States) Ashwin Kumar (France) Laurent Rochette	2–6, 7–6^{(10–8)}, [6–10]
Win	1–1	Oct 2011	Sweden F6, Falun	Futures	Hard (i)	(United Kingdom) Daniel Smethurst	(Sweden) Pierre Bonfre (Sweden) Viktor Stjern	7–6^{(7–2)}, 7–6^{(8–6)}
Win	2–1	Oct 2011	Great Britain F17, Cardiff	Futures	Hard (i)	(United Kingdom) Sean Thornley	(United Kingdom) Daniel Cox (United Kingdom) Daniel Smethurst	6–4, 6–4
Win	3–1	Dec 2011	Turkey F33, Antalya	Futures	Hard	(Belgium) Joris De Loore	(Bosnia and Herzegovina) Damir Džumhur (Bosnia and Herzegovina) Aldin Šetkić	6–3, 7–6^{(7–5)}
Win	4–1	Dec 2011	Turkey F35, Antalya	Futures	Hard	(France) Gleb Sakharov	(Italy) Antonio Comporto (Italy) Thomas Fabbiano	6–2, 6–1
Win	5–1	Jul 2012	Belgium F3, Knokke	Futures	Clay	(Belgium) Joris De Loore	(Netherlands Antilles) Alexander Blom (Australia) Thanasi Kokkinakis	5–7, 7–6^{(7–3)}, [10–7]
Loss	5–2	Aug 2012	Great Britain F12, Wrexham	Futures	Hard	(United Kingdom) Sean Thornley	(United Kingdom) Lewis Burton (United Kingdom) Edward Corrie	4–6, 0–6
Loss	5–3	Aug 2012	Belgium F8, Koksijde	Futures	Clay	(Belgium) Joris De Loore	(Republic of Ireland) Daniel Glancy (Mexico) Manuel Sánchez	6–3, 2–6, [8–10]
Loss	5–4	May 2013	Italy F6, Pozzuoli	Futures	Clay	(Ukraine) Denys Mylokostov	(United Kingdom) Ken Skupski (United Kingdom) Neal Skupski	3–6, 3–6
Win	6–4	Jun 2013	Spain F15, Madrid	Futures	Clay	(United Kingdom) Alexander Ward	(Germany) Richard Becker (Italy) Lorenzo Giustino	6–3, 2–6, [10–5]
Loss	6–5	Nov 2013	Greece F18, Heraklion	Futures	Hard	(United Kingdom) Luke Bambridge	(Serbia) Marko Djokovic (Spain) Carlos Gómez-Herrera	1–6, 7–6^{(7–3)}, [11–13]
Win	7–5	Nov 2013	Greece F19, Heraklion	Futures	Hard	(United Kingdom) Luke Bambridge	(Germany) Andreas Mies (Germany) Oscar Otte	6–3, 7–5
Win	8–5	Mar 2014	Greece F1, Heraklion	Futures	Hard	(Greece) Alexandros Jakupovic	(Serbia) Nikola Čačić (Serbia) Ilija Vucic	6–1, 3–6, [10–5]
Loss	8–6	Apr 2014	Qatar F3, Doha	Futures	Hard	(United Kingdom) Joshua Ward-Hibbert	(Chinese Taipei) Chen Ti (South Africa) Ruan Roelofse	1–6, 1–6
Win	9–6	Jul 2014	Great Britain F12, Manchester	Futures	Hard	(United Kingdom) George Morgan	(United Kingdom) Edward Corrie (United Kingdom) Joshua Ward-Hibbert	7–6^{(7–4)}, 4–6, [10–6]

== Junior titles ==
=== Singles ===
==== Junior Grand Slams: 1 (1–0) ====
Outcome	Year	Championship	Surface	Opponent	Score
Winner	2011	US Open	Hard	(Czech Republic) Jiří Veselý	5–7, 6–3, 6–4

=== Doubles ===
==== Youth Olympics 1 (1–0) ====
Outcome	No.	Date	Championship	Surface	Partner	Opponents	Score
Winner	1.	20 August 2010	Youth Olympics, Singapore	Hard	(Czech Republic) Jiří Veselý	(Russia) Victor Baluda (Russia) Mikhail Biryukov	6–3, 6–1

==== Junior Doubles: 0 (0–2) ====
Outcome	No.	Date	Championship	Surface	Partner	Opponents	Score
Runner-up	1.	13 September 2010	US Open	Hard	(Czech Republic) Jiří Veselý	(Peru) Duilio Beretta (Ecuador) Roberto Quiroz	1–6, 5–7
Runner-up	2.	3 July 2011	Wimbledon	Grass	(Czech Republic) Jiří Veselý	(United Kingdom) George Morgan (Croatia) Mate Pavić	6–3, 4–6, 5–7

== Performance timelines ==
Key
W	F	SF	QF	#R	RR	Q#	DNQ	A	NH

(W) winner; (F) finalist; (SF) semifinalist; (QF) quarterfinalist; (#R) rounds 4, 3, 2, 1; (RR) round-robin stage; (Q#) qualification round; (DNQ) did not qualify; (A) absent; (NH) not held; (SR) strike rate (events won / competed); (W–L) win–loss record.

=== Singles ===
Tournament	2011	2012	2013	2014	Career SR	Career W-L
Grand Slam tournaments
Australian Open	A	A	A	A	0/0	0–0
French Open	A	A	A	A	0/0	0–0
Wimbledon	Q2	1R	A	Q2	0/1	0–1
US Open	A	A	A	A	0/0	0–0
Win–loss	0–0	0–1	0–0	0–0	0/1	0–1
Career statistics
Tournaments played	1	2	0	0	Career total: 3	
Titles	0	0	0	0	Career total: 0	
Finals reached	0	0	0	0	Career total: 0	
Overall win–loss	0–1	0–2	0–0	0–0	0/3	0–3
Win %	0%	0%	0%	0%	0%	0%
Year end ranking	701	431	406		–	

=== Doubles ===
Current through 2012 Wimbledon Championships.

Tournament	2011	2012	Career S/R	Career W-L
Grand Slam tournaments
Australian Open	A	A	0/0	0–0
French Open	A	A	0/0	0–0
Wimbledon	Q1	1R	0/1	0–1
US Open	A	A	0/0	0–0
Summer Olympics	Not held	A	0/0	0–0
Win–loss	0–0	0–1	0/1	0–1
Career statistics
Tournaments played	0	1	Career total: 1	
Titles	0	0	Career total: 0	
Finals reached	0	0	Career total: 0	
Overall win–loss	0–0	0–1	0/1	0–1
Win %	0%	0%	0%	0%
Year end ranking	477		–	

== Education ==
Golding was educated at Newland House School, an independent school in Twickenham in south west London.

He attended Ganeass Educational Support Services from 2003 to 2010. During that time he achieved five GCSEs by the time he was 14, going on to complete three A levels before the age of 17.

== Acting career ==
Golding's earliest appearance was on television in a commercial for Vauxhall Motors, as a two-year-old baby in 1996. After a small part in a stage version of Wind in the Willows in 1997, his next television role was in 1998 as Nat in the first two episodes of the wartime romantic drama Coming Home, which starred Keira Knightley.

Golding's first film project was as one of four small boys in Mike Leigh's award-winning 2002 comedy drama All or Nothing. His biggest film role to date then came in The Adventures of Greyfriars Bobby, a tale of the story of Greyfriars Bobby, a child who takes on the responsibility of a policeman's dog after his death, and who has to win the battle with authority to save the dog's life. Though casting began in 2002, the film was much delayed due to problems with the funding. Shooting largely took place during 2004–05, and the film was released in France on 11 May 2005, Italy in July 2005, the USA on 29 October 2005 and at the Children's Film Festival in the UK on 16 November 2005.

In 2003 Golding portrayed Jeremy Potts in another stage show, Chitty Chitty Bang Bang, in London's West End. In the same year, he appeared as one of the children in Ibsen's play, Brand, which starred Ralph Fiennes and was directed by Adrian Noble.

In March 2004, Golding made an appearance as a young customer in "Elephants and Hens", episode 2 of the third season of Black Books, the television comedy series about a dysfunctional bookshop owner, played by Dylan Moran. Then, in April of the same year, he took the part of Tom Dawson in the fifth episode of the Carlton Television production, Murder in Suburbia, in which Gwyneth Strong played his mother Pat. Finally in 2004, he provided the voice of Xath in the English version of the animated puppet fantasy Strings, co-produced by Birdpic Limited in association with Scandinavian partnerships.

In June 2008, Golding appeared in the BBC Three TV documentary Child Stars, featuring three promising youngsters with outstanding talent and ambition. However, he has forgone further advancement as an actor to concentrate on a possible tennis career.

=== Filmography ===
- All or Nothing (2002)
- Strings (voice) (2004)
- The Adventures of Greyfriars Bobby (2005)

== Personal life ==
Golding lives in London with his partner, former tennis professional and now tennis coach Marta Sirotkina.
