= Mikhail Biryukov (tennis) =

Russian tennis player (1992–2019)

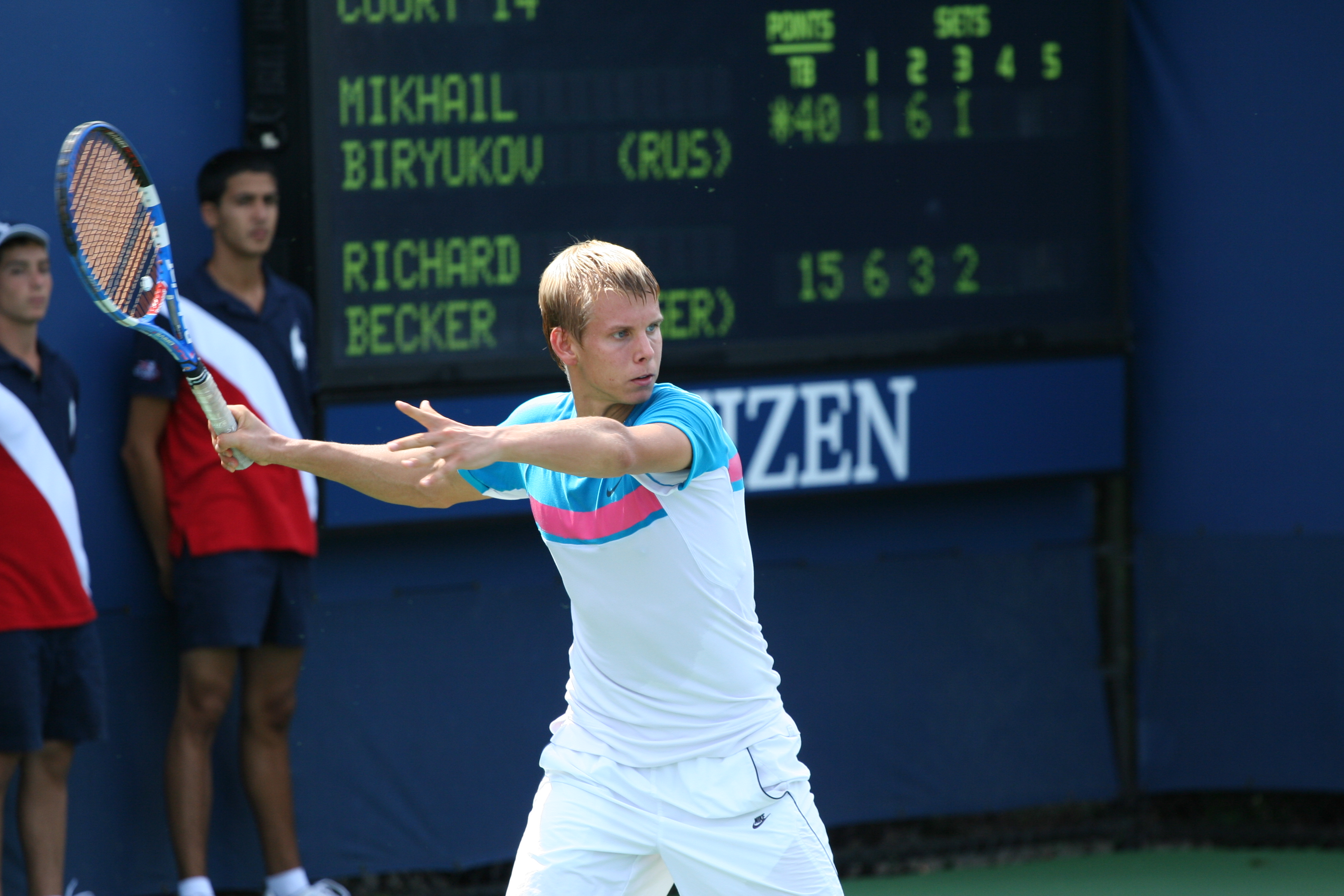
- Mikhail Biryukov at the 2010 Summer Youth Olympics boys' single and double event
- Native name: Михаил Сергеевич Бирюков
- Country (sports): Russia
- Born: 28 April 1992 Russia
- Died: 4 October 2019 (aged 27) Moscow, Russia
- Retired: 2014
- Plays: Right-handed (two-handed backhand)
- Prize money: $51,200

Singles
- Career record: 0–2
- Career titles: 0
- Highest ranking: No. 292 (7 October 2013)

Doubles
- Career record: 0–0
- Career titles: 0
- Highest ranking: No. 536 (17 March 2014)
Medal record
Representing Russia
Men's tennis
Youth Olympic Games
Silver medal – second place	2010 Singapore	Doubles
- Last updated on: 14 October 2019.

Mikhail Sergeyevich Biryukov (Russian: Михаил Сергеевич Бирюков; 28 April 1992 – 4 October 2019) was a Russian junior tennis player. His highest ATP singles ranking was 292. After his retirement from professional tennis at age 22, he served as a coach of under 16 player Alexey Zakharov.

== Tennis career ==
On 21 August 2010, Mikhail, representing Russia, won the doubles silver medal in the inaugural Youth Olympic Games held in Singapore with Victor Baluda. Mikhail and Victor were defeated by the Briton Oliver Golding and by the Czech Jiri Vesely 6–3, 6–1.

== Personal life and death ==
Biryukov was the son of four-time World Champion in modern pentathlon, Irina Kiseleva. On 4 October 2019, Biryukov was found dead in Moscow. He died by suicide.
