= Ricardo Rodríguez-Pace =

Venezuelan tennis player (born 1993)

- Country (sports): Venezuela
- Born: 28 April 1993 (age 32) Caracas, Venezuela
- Height: 189 cm (6 ft 2 in)
- Turned pro: 2012
- Plays: Right-handed (two-handed backhand)
- Prize money: $139,838

Singles
- Career record: 21–12 (ATP Tour level, Grand Slam level, and Davis Cup)
- Career titles: 0
- Highest ranking: No. 282 (9 June 2014)
- Current ranking: No. 1019 (27 October 2025)

Doubles
- Career record: 0–1
- Highest ranking: No. 521 (6 January 2020)
- Last updated on: 30 October 2025.

Ricardo Rodríguez-Pace (born 28 April 1993) is a Venezuelan professional tennis player. He achieved a career high ATP ranking of World No. 282 on 9 June 2014. He reached his highest doubles ranking in October 2016 of No. 670. He has won eleven ITF titles in singles and nine in doubles. He is currently the No. 2 Venezuelan player.

Rodríguez is also a member of the Venezuela Davis Cup team where he holds the record of most singles victories in the history of Venezuela (22-9) in 17 appearances.

== Early life ==
Born in Caracas, Venezuela, Rodríguez started playing tennis at the age of seven.

== Career ==
As a junior, Rodriguez got his highest ranking of Number 10 in the world (January 2010) where he competed in two Grand Slams (Roland Garros and US Open), one Grade A (Copa Gerdau, Brazil) reaching to semifinals, and became the first Venezuelan in the history to play a Youth Olympic Games (Singapore 2010) where amongst with his partner from Paraguay Diego Galeano, lost the match for the bronze medal.

Rodriguez made his first appearance in Davis Cup in February 2012, in the tie played in Caracas against Puerto Rico, for the first round of America's group II. Rodriguez won 6 singles in a row, breaking the previous record of most singles wins without losing held by Isaias Pimentel (3-0). In the 2013 campaign, Rodriguez went undefeated to take Venezuela into America's group I, winning 4 singles in 3 ties (Guatemala, Peru, El Salvador). Rodriguez continued playing Davis Cup helping Venezuela to reach 3 consecutive America's group II finals, after the relegation of the 2014 Davis Cup campaign. In February 2018, Rodriguez breaks the record of most singles victories in the history of Venezuela's Davis Cup, by beating the player number 1 of Guatemala Christofer Diaz with scores of (4-6, 6–3, 6-0) and clinching the last point to win the tie. Later that year he added one more victory to consolidate his Davis Cup performance against Uruguay.

As a singles player, Rodriguez has combined his participations between the Challenger Tour and the Futures Tour. At Challenger Level, he twice reached the Round of 16; in Milan (2013, d. Marsel Ilhan) and Portoroz (2014, d. Steven Diez). Combined, he had a positive record of 317-196 (W-L), with a total of 11 titles in three different continents, which made him the best ranked player of Venezuela in 2020.
