= Equestrian at the 2010 Summer Youth Olympics =

Equestrian at the I Summer Youth Olympic Games
- Venue: Singapore Turf Riding Club
- Dates: 18 – 24 August 2010
- No. of events: 2
- Competitors: 30 from 30 nations

The Equestrian competition at the 2010 Summer Youth Olympics in Singapore took place from August 18 to August 24 at the Singapore Turf Riding Club. There were two events, team jumping and individual jumping. The team jumping was between continents.

== Competitors ==
Name	Country
Zakarta Hamici	Algeria
Maria Victoria Paz	Argentina
Thomas McDermott	Australia
Kelsey Bayley	Barbados
Nicola Philippaerts	Belgium
Guilherme Foroni	Brazil
Dominique Schwalm	Canada
Xu Zhengyang	China
Mario Gamboa	Colombia
Mohamed Abdalla	Egypt
Carian Scudamore	Great Britain
Juan Diego Saenz Morel	Guatemala
Jasmine Zin Man Lai	Hong Kong
Valentina Isoradi	Italy
Timur Patarov	Kazakhstan
Abduladim Mlitan	Libya
Jake Lambert	New Zealand
Sultan Al Tooqi	Oman
Alejandra Ortiz	Panama
Wojciech Dahlke	Poland
Abdurahman Al Marri	Qatar
Dalma Rushdi Malhas	Saudi Arabia
Samantha McIntosh	South Africa
Pei Jia Caroline Chew	Singapore
Martin Fuchs	Switzerland
Mohamad Alanzarouti	Syria
Sheikh Ali Abdulla Majid	United Arab Emirates
Marcelo Chirico	Uruguay
Eirin Bruheim	United States
Yara Hanssen	Zimbabwe

== Schedule ==
Date	Start time	Competition
August 18	9.30am	Jumping Team Preliminary
August 20	9.30am	Jumping Team Final
August 22	9.30am	Jumping Individual Preliminary
August 24	9.30am	Jumping Individual Final

== Medal summary ==
=== Medal table ===
This table presents only individual results. Mixed team medals are not included.

Rank	Nation	Gold	Silver	Bronze	Total
1	Mixed-NOCs	1	1	1	3
2	Uruguay	1	0	0	1
3	Colombia	0	1	0	1
4	Saudi Arabia	0	0	1	1
Totals (4 entries)		2	2	2	6

=== Events ===
Event	Gold	Silver	Bronze
Individual jumping	Marcelo Chirico; Uruguay	Mario Gamboa; Colombia	Dalma Rushdi H Malhas; Saudi Arabia
Team jumping	Europe; Martin Fuchs; Switzerland; Wojciech Dahlke; Poland; Valentina Isoardi; Italy; Carian Scudamore; Great Britain; Nicola Philippaerts; Belgium	Australasia; Zin Man Lai; Hong Kong; Jake Lambert; New Zealand; Zhengyang Xu; China; Sultan Al Tooqi; Oman; Thomas McDermott; Australia	Africa; Yara Hanssen; Zimbabwe; Zakaria Hamici; Algeria; Abduladim Mlitan; Libya; Mohamed Abdalla; Egypt; Samantha McIntosh; South Africa
