= Equestrian at the 2010 Summer Youth Olympics – Individual jumping =

The individual jumping event at the 2010 Summer Youth Olympics in Singapore took place from August 22 to August 24 at the Singapore Turf Riding Club. Riders completed two rounds of jumping where the rider with the fewest penalties would win. A jump-off would be played should riders in medal positions be tied.

== Medalists ==
Gold	Silver	Bronze
Marcelo Chirico; Uruguay	Mario Gamboa; Colombia	Dalma Rushdi H Malhas; Saudi Arabia

== Results ==
=== Round A ===
Rank	Rider	Horse	Penalties		Total Penalties
Rank	Rider	Horse	Jump	Time	Total Penalties
1	Marcelo Chirico (URU)	Links Hot Gossip	0	0	0
1	Thomas McDermott (AUS)	Hugo	0	0	0
1	Mohamed Abdalla (EGY)	Buzzword	0	0	0
1	Timur Patarov (KAZ)	Chatham Park Rosie	0	0	0
1	Dominique Shone (CAN)	Roxy Girl	0	0	0
1	Guilherme Foroni (BRA)	The Hec Man	0	0	0
1	Samantha McIntosh (RSA)	Little Miss Sunshine	0	0	0
1	Wojciech Dahlke (POL)	Travelling Soldior	0	0	0
1	Mario Gamboa (COL)	LH Titan	0	0	0
10	Zakaria Hamici (ALG)	APH Mr Sheen	4	0	4
10	Mohamad Alanzarouti (SYR)	Van Diemen	4	0	4
10	Sheikh Ali Abdulla Majid Alqassimi (UAE)	Pearl Monarch	4	0	4
10	Abdurahman Al Marri (QAT)	Emmaville Persuasion	4	0	4
10	Dalma Rushdi H Malhas (KSA)	Flash Top Hat	4	0	4
10	Juan Diego Saenz Morel (GUA)	Little Plains	4	0	4
16	Jasmine Zin Man Lai (HKG)	Butterfly Kisses	8	0	8
16	Nicola Philippaerts (BEL)	Gippsland Girl	8	0	8
16	Alejandra Ortiz (PAN)	Sobraon Park Fancy Pants	8	0	8
16	Caroline Chew (SIN)	Gatineau	8	0	8
16	Martin Fuchs (SUI)	Midnight Mist	8	0	8
16	Abduladim Mlitan (LBA)	Belcam Hinnerk	8	0	8
16	Eirin Bruheim (USA)	Lenny Hays	8	0	8
23	Kelsey Bayley (BAR)	Flare Virtuous	12	0	12
23	Sultan Al Tooqi (OMA)	Joondooree Farms Damiro	12	0	12
23	Zhengyang Xu (CHN)	Foxdale Villarni	12	0	12
23	Jake Lambert (NZL)	Le Lucky	12	0	12
27	Alberto Schwalm (CHI)	Stoneleigh Eddie	16	0	16
28	Yara Hanssen (ZIM)	AP Akermanis	24	1	25
	Maria Victoria Paz (ARG)	Glen Haven Accolade	Eliminated		

=== Round B ===
Rank	Rider	Horse	Penalties		Round A Penalties	Total Penalties
Rank	Rider	Horse	Jump	Time	Round A Penalties	Total Penalties
1	Marcelo Chirico (URU)	Links Hot Gossip	0	0	0	0
1	Mario Gamboa (COL)	LH Titan	0	0	0	0
3	Dalma Rushdi H Malhas (KSA)	Flash Top Hat	0	0	4	4
3	Samantha McIntosh (RSA)	Little Miss Sunshine	4	0	0	4
3	Abdurahman Al Marri (QAT)	Emmaville Persuasion	0	0	4	4
3	Wojciech Dahlke (POL)	Travelling Soldior	4	0	0	4
3	Mohamad Alanzarouti (SYR)	Van Diemen	0	0	4	4
3	Thomas McDermott (AUS)	Hugo	4	0	0	4
9	Martin Fuchs (SUI)	Midnight Mist	0	0	8	0
9	Abduladim Mlitan (LBA)	Belcam Hinnerk	0	0	8	0
9	Sheikh Ali Abdulla Majid Alqassimi (UAE)	Pearl Monarch	4	0	4	8
9	Juan Diego Saenz Morel (GUA)	Little Plains	4	0	4	8
9	Mohamed Abdalla (EGY)	Buzzword	8	0	0	8
9	Timur Patarov (KAZ)	Chatham Park Rosie	8	0	0	8
9	Dominique Shone (CAN)	Roxy Girl	8	0	0	8
9	Guilherme Foroni (BRA)	The Hec Man	8	0	0	8
17	Jasmine Zin Man Lai (HKG)	Butterfly Kisses	4	0	8	12
17	Caroline Chew (SIN)	Gatineau	4	0	8	12
17	Eirin Bruheim (USA)	Lenny Hays	4	0	8	12
20	Zakaria Hamici (ALG)	APH Mr Sheen	8	1	4	13
21	Kelsey Bayley (BAR)	Virtuous Flare	4	0	12	16
21	Jake Lambert (NZL)	Le Lucky	4	0	12	16
23	Alberto Schwalm (CHI)	Stoneleigh Eddie	4	0	16	20
23	Nicola Philippaerts (BEL)	Gippsland Girl	12	0	6	20
23	Alejandra Ortiz (PAN)	Sobraon Park Fancy Pants	12	0	8	20
26	Zhengyang Xu (CHN)	Foxdale Villarni	12	2	12	26
27	Sultan Al Tooqi (OMA)	Joondooree Farms Damiro	16	0	12	28
28	Yara Hanssen (ZIM)	AP Akermanis	24	0	25	49
	Maria Victoria Paz (ARG)	Glen Haven Accolade	Eliminated			

==== Bronze Medal Jump-Off ====
Rank	Rider	Horse	Penalties	Time (s)
Bronze medal	Dalma Rushdi H Malhas (KSA)	Flash Top Hat	0	38.05
4	Samantha McIntosh (RSA)	Little Miss Sunshine	0	40.32
5	Abdurahman Al Marri (QAT)	Emmaville Persuasion	4	38.61
6	Wojciech Dahlke (POL)	Travelling Soldior	4	40.03
7	Mohamad Alanzarouti (SYR)	Van Diemen	4	40.75
8	Thomas McDermott (AUS)	Hugo	8	52.18

==== Gold Medal Jump-Off ====
Rank	Rider	Horse	Penalties	Time (s)
Gold medal	Marcelo Chirico (URU)	Links Hot Gossip	0	42.35
Silver medal	Mario Gamboa (COL)	LH Titan	14	60.63
