= Shooting at the 2010 Summer Youth Olympics =

Shooting at the I Summer Youth Olympic Games
- Venue: Singapore Sports School
- Dates: 22 – 25 August 2010
- No. of events: 4 (2 boys, 2 girls)

Shooting at the 2010 Summer Youth Olympics, as approved by the International Shooting Sport Federation, comprised 10 metre air rifle and 10 metre air pistol, each for boys (60 shots) and girls (40 shots), with 80 competitors altogether. For each of the four events, a total of twenty NOCs qualified and participated with one competitor each.

The continental confederations of ISSF organized special qualifying competitions for shooters born in 1992 and 1993. The minimum qualification scores (MQS) have been set at 552 / 368 (60 shots boys / 40 shots girls) for air rifle and at 540 / 355 (60 shots boys / 40 shots girls) for air pistol. In comparison, the "adult" MQS for the 2008 Beijing Summer Olympics were air rifle 570 / 375 and air pistol 563 / 365 respectively.

Confederation	Spots per event	Qualification event	
Confederation	Spots per event	Date	Venue
Africa	1	25–31 March 2010	Algiers (ALG)
America	2	2–6 December 2009	Colorado Springs (USA)
America	2	25–28 March 2010	Guatemala City (GUA)
Asia	4	16–22 December 2009	Doha (QAT)
Europe	6	7–14 March 2010	Meråker (NOR)
Oceania	1	14–16 August 2009	Sydney (AUS)
Oceania	1	27 November – 7 December 2009	Sydney (AUS)
Universality places IOC	6		

1 In the girls' air rifle and the boys' air pistol competitions, one of these spots is reserved for the host country, Singapore.

== Qualified Athletes ==
=== Boys 10m Air Pistol ===
- (Armenia) Romik Vardumyan
- (Australia) Janek Janski
- (Belarus) Aliaksei Horbach
- (Brazil) Felipe Almeida Wu
- (Bulgaria) Solomon Borisov
- (China) Jia Ziayong
- (Czech Republic) Jindřich Dubový
- (Egypt) Raef Tawfik Mohamed
- (France) Vincent Jeanningros
- (Germany) Philipp Kaefer
- (Hungary) Csaba Bartók
- (Iran) Sepehr Saffariboroujeni
- (South Korea) Choi Dae-han
- (Mexico) Julio Nava
- (Romania) Stefan Rares Ion
- (Russia) Nikolay Kilin
- (Singapore) Wu Wenyi
- (San Marino) Elia Andruccioli
- (Taiwan) Tien Shao-Chien
- (Ukraine) Denys Kushnirov

=== Girls 10m Air Pistol ===
- (Australia) Emily Esposito
- (Belarus) Kseniya Faminykh
- (Canada) Danielle Marcotte
- (China) Fang Xue
- (Croatia) Valentina Pereglin
- (Czech Republic) Sarka Jonakova
- (Egypt) Hala Abdel Rahman
- (Guatemala) Geraldine Solórzano Manson
- (India) Ruchi Singh
- (Iran) Yasaman Heidari
- (Italy) Chiara Marini
- (South Korea) Kim Jang-mi
- (Mexico) Mariana Nava
- (North Macedonia) Dijana Petrova
- (Romania) Alexandra Silvia Morar
- (Russia) Ekaterina Barsukova
- (Switzerland) Eliane Dohner
- (Thailand) Kanokkan Chaimongkol
- (Uzbekistan) Lenara Asanova
- (Vietnam) Thi Ngoc Duong Nguyen

=== Boys 10m Air Rifle ===
- (Australia) John Coombes
- (Austria) Stefan Rumpler
- (Belarus) Illia Charheika
- (China) Zeng Yi
- (Croatia) Tiziano Suran
- (Czech Republic) Petr Plechac
- (Egypt) Hossam Salah Eldeen
- (Finland) Jaakko Bjorkbacka
- (Germany) Alexander Thomas
- (Guatemala) Elvin Aroldo Lopez Calderon
- (Hungary) István Kapás
- (India) Navdeep Singh Rathore
- (Italy) Simon Weithaler
- (Kazakhstan) Irshat Avkhadiyev
- (South Korea) Kim Yong
- (Mexico) Erick Arzate Marchan
- (Russia) Egor Maksimov
- (Switzerland) Jan Lochbihler
- (United Arab Emirates) Salem Matar Ali Alqaydi
- (Ukraine) Serhiy Kulish

=== Girls 10m Air Rifle ===
- Cornelia Enser (AUT)
- Syeda Sadia Sultana (BAN)
- Chen Fang (CHN)
- Tanja Perec (CRO)
- Gabriela Vognarová (CZE)
- Dina Elharouni (EGY)
- Jennifer Olry (FRA)
- Jaqueline Orth (GER)
- Polymaria Velasquez Alvarado (GUA)
- Katinka Szijj (HUN)
- Neha Milind Sapte (IND)
- Go Do Won (KOR)
- Hessah Alzayed (KUW)
- Majduleen Milud (LBA)
- Isamar Guerrero (MEX)
- Siw Anita Dramstad (NOR)
- Jenna Kendall Louise Mackenzie (NZL)
- Bahya Al Hamad (QAT)
- Shang Hui Carol Lee (SIN)
- Jasmin Mischler (SUI)

== Competition schedule ==
Event date	Event day	Starting time	Event details
22 August	Sunday	12:00	Boys' 10m Air Rifle
23 August	Monday	11:30	Girls' 10m Air Pistol
24 August	Tuesday	12:00	Boys' 10m Air Pistol
25 August	Wednesday	11:30	Girls' 10m Air Rifle

== Medal summary ==
=== Medal table ===
Rank	Nation	Gold	Silver	Bronze	Total
1	South Korea	2	0	1	3
2	China	1	1	0	2
3	Ukraine	1	0	1	2
4	Belarus	0	1	0	1
4	Brazil	0	1	0	1
4	Czech Republic	0	1	0	1
7	Guatemala	0	0	1	1
7	Switzerland	0	0	1	1
Totals (8 entries)		4	4	4	12

=== Events ===
Event	Gold	Silver	Bronze
Boys' 10m Air Pistol	Denys Kushnirov; Ukraine	Felipe Almeida Wu; Brazil	Choi Dae-han; South Korea
Boys' 10m Air Rifle	Gao Tingjie; China	Illia Charheika; Belarus	Serhiy Kulish; Ukraine
Girls' 10m Air Pistol	Kim Jang-mi; South Korea	Xue Fang; China	Geraldine Solórzano; Guatemala
Girls' 10m Air Rifle	Go Do-won; South Korea	Gabriela Vognarová; Czech Republic	Jasmin Mischler; Switzerland
