= Equestrian at the 2010 Summer Youth Olympics – Team jumping =

The team jumping event at the 2010 Summer Youth Olympics in Singapore took place from August 18 to August 20 at the Singapore Turf Riding Club. Riders competed in teams based on geographical origin where in two rounds of jumping the team with the fewest penalties would win. Only the best 3 rider's score in each team will count towards the team score. A jump-off will be played should teams in medal positions be tied.

== Medalists ==
Gold	Silver	Bronze
Europe; Martin Fuchs; Switzerland; Wojciech Dahlke; Poland; Valentina Isoardi; Italy; Carian Scudamore; Great Britain; Nicola Philippaerts; Belgium	Australasia; Jasmine Zin Man Lai; Hong Kong; Jake Lambert; New Zealand; Zhengyang XU; China; Sultan Al Tooqi; Oman; Thomas McDermott; Australia	Africa; Yara Hanssen; Zimbabwe; Zakaria Hamici; Algeria; Abduladim Mlitan; Libya; Mohamed Abdalla; Egypt; Samantha McIntosh; South Africa

== Results ==
=== Round 1 ===
Rank	Riders	Horses	Penalties			Total Team Penalties
Rank	Riders	Horses	Jump	Time	Total	Total Team Penalties
1	Australasia; Jasmine Zin Man Lai (HKG); Jake Lambert (NZL); Zhengyang Xu (CHN); Sultan Al Tooqi (OMA); Thomas McDermott (AUS)	Butterfly Kisses; Le Lucky; Foxdale Villarni; Joondooree Farms Damiro; Hugo	~~12~~; 0; ~~16~~; 4; 0	~~0~~; 0; ~~0~~; 0; 0	~~12~~; 0; ~~16~~; 4; 0	4
1	Africa; Yara Hanssen (ZIM); Zakaria Hamici (ALG); Abduladim Mlitan (LBA); Mohamed Abdalla (EGY); Samantha McIntosh (RSA)	AP Akermanis; APH Mr Sheen; Belcam Hinnerk; Buzzword; Little Miss Sunshine	~~12~~; ~~12~~; 4; 0; 0	~~0~~; ~~0~~; 0; 0; 0	~~12~~; ~~12~~; 4; 0; 0	4
1	Europe; Martin Fuchs (SUI); Wojciech Dahlke (POL); Valentina Isoardi (ITA); Carian Scudamore (GBR); Nicola Philippaerts (BEL)	Midnight Mist; Travelling Soldior; Alloria Thomas; Mighty Mcgyver; Gippsland Girl	0; ~~12~~; ~~28~~; 0; 4	0; ~~0~~; ~~0~~; 0; 0	0; ~~12~~; ~~28~~; 0; 4	4
4	Asia; Mohamad Alanzarouti (SYR); Timur Patarov (KAZ); Abdurahman Al Marri (QAT); Caroline Chew (SIN); Sheikh Ali Abdulla Mijad Alqassimi (UAE)	Van Diemen; Chatham Park Rosie; Emmaville Persuasion; Gatineau; Pearl Monarch	~~8~~; ~~EL~~; 4; 4; 4	~~0~~; ~~EL~~; 0; 0; 0	~~8~~; ~~EL~~; 4; 4; 4	12
4	South America; Guilherme Foroni (BRA); Maria Victoria Paz (ARG); Alberto Schwalm (CHI); Mario Gamboa (COL); Marcelo Chirico (URU)	The Hec Man; Glen Haven Accolade; Stoneleigh Eddie; LH Titan; Links Hot Gossip	~~16~~; ~~12~~; 8; 4; 0	~~0~~; ~~0~~; 0; 0; 0	~~16~~; ~~12~~; 8; 4; 0	12
6	N/C America & C. Islands; Eirin Bruheim (USA); Kelsey Bayley (BAR); Alejandra Ortiz (PAN); Juan Diego Saenz Morel (GUA); Dominique Shone (CAN)	Lenny Hays; Virtuous Fire; Sobraon Park Fancy Pants; Little Plains; Roxy Girl	~~16~~; 8; ~~8~~; 4; 4	~~0~~; 0; ~~0~~; 0; 0	~~16~~; 8; ~~8~~; 4; 4	16

=== Round 2 ===
Rank	Riders	Horses	Penalties			Round 1 Team Penalties	Round 2 Team Penalties	Total Team Penalties
Rank	Riders	Horses	Jump	Time	Total	Round 1 Team Penalties	Round 2 Team Penalties	Total Team Penalties
1	Europe; Martin Fuchs (SUI); Wojciech Dahlke (POL); Valentina Isoardi (ITA); Carian Scudamore (GBR); Nicola Philippaerts (BEL)	Midnight Mist; Travelling Soldior; Alloria Thomas; Mighty Mcgyver; Gippsland Girl	0; 4; ~~16~~; 0; ~~4~~	0; 0; ~~0~~; 0; ~~0~~	0; 4; ~~16~~; 0; ~~4~~	4	4	8
1	Australasia; Jasmine Zin Man Lai (HKG); Jake Lambert (NZL); Zhengyang Xu (CHN); Sultan Al Tooqi (OMA); Thomas McDermott (AUS)	Butterfly Kisses; Le Lucky; Foxdale Villarni; Joondooree Farms Damiro; Hugo	4; 0; ~~20~~; ~~4~~; 0	0; 0; ~~0~~; ~~0~~; 0	4; 0; ~~20~~; ~~4~~; 0	4	4	8
1	Africa; Yara Hanssen (ZIM); Zakaria Hamici (ALG); Abduladim Mlitan (LBA); Mohamed Abdalla (EGY); Samantha McIntosh (RSA)	AP Akermanis; APH Mr Sheen; Belcam Hinnerk; Buzzword; Little Miss Sunshine	~~16~~; ~~8~~; 0; 4; 0	~~0~~; ~~1~~; 0; 0; 0	~~16~~; ~~9~~; 0; 4; 0	4	4	8
4	Asia; Mohamad Alanzarouti (SYR); Timur Patarov (KAZ); Abdurahman Al Marri (QAT); Caroline Chew (SIN); Sheikh Ali Abdulla Mijad Alqassimi (UAE)	Van Diemen; Chatham Park Rosie; Emmaville Persuasion; Gatineau; Pearl Monarch	~~4~~; 0; ~~8~~; 0; 0	~~0~~; 0; ~~0~~; 0; 0	~~4~~; 0; ~~8~~; 0; 0	12	0	12
5	South America; Guilherme Foroni (BRA); Maria Victoria Paz (ARG); Alberto Schwalm (CHI); Mario Gamboa (COL); Marcelo Chirico (URU)	The Hec Man; Glen Haven Accolade; Stoneleigh Eddie; LH Titan; Links Hot Gossip	0; ~~16~~; ~~16~~; 0; 4	0; ~~0~~; ~~0~~; 0; 0	0; ~~16~~; ~~16~~; 0; 4	12	4	16
6	N/C America & C. Islands; Eirin Bruheim (USA); Kelsey Bayley (BAR); Alejandra Ortiz (PAN); Juan Diego Saenz Morel (GUA); Shone Dominique (CAN)	Lenny Hays; Virtuous Flare; Sobraon Park Pancy Pants; Little Plains; Roxy Girl	~~20~~; ~~12~~; 8; 8; 0	~~1~~; ~~1~~; 0; 0; 0	~~21~~; ~~13~~; 8; 8; 0	16	16	32

==== Gold Medal Jump-Off ====
Rank	Riders	Horses	Penalties		Time (s)	
Rank	Riders	Horses	Individual	Team	Individual	Team
Gold medal	Europe; Martin Fuchs (SUI); Wojciech Dahlke (POL); Valentina Isoardi (ITA); Carian Scudamore (GBR); Nicola Philippaerts (BEL)	Midnight Mist; Travelling Soldior; Alloria Thomas; Mighty Mcgyver; Gippsland Girl	0; 0; ~~24~~; 4; ~~DNS~~	4	45.30; 49.19; ~~54.92~~; 46.54; ~~DNS~~	141.03
Silver medal	Australasia; Jasmine Zin Man Lai (HKG); Jake Lambert (NZL); Zhengyang Xu (CHN); Sultan Al Tooqi (OMA); Thomas McDermott (AUS)	Butterfly Kisses; Le Lucky; Foxdale Villarni; Joondooree Farms Damiro; Hugo	0; ~~12~~; 0; 4; ~~8~~	4	50.57; ~~46.13~~; 51.46; 52.23; ~~46.10~~	154.26
Bronze medal	Africa; Yara Hanssen (ZIM); Zakaria Hamici (ALG); Abduladim Mlitan (LBA); Mohamed Abdalla (EGY); Samantha McIntosh (RSA)	AP Akermanis; APH Mr Sheen; Belcam Hinnerk; Buzzword; Little Miss Sunshine	~~9~~; 8; 8; 8; ~~DNS~~	24	~~63.57~~; 47.48; 55.59; 54.39; ~~DNS~~	157.46
