= Colombia at the 2010 Summer Youth Olympics =

- IOC code: COL
- NOC: Colombian Olympic Committee
- Website: www.olimpicocol.co (in Spanish)

in Singapore
- Competitors: 23 in 12 sports
- Flag bearer: Éider Arévalo
- Medals Ranked 22nd: Gold 2 Silver 3 Bronze 0 Total 5

Summer Youth Olympics appearances (overview)
- 2010; 2014; 2018

Colombia participated in the 2010 Summer Youth Olympics in Singapore.

== Medalists ==
Medal	Name	Sport	Event	Date
Gold	Juan Sebastián Gómez	Tennis	Boys' Singles	21 Aug
Gold	Jhonnatan Botero Villegas; Jessica Lergada; Brayan Ramírez; David Oquendo	Cycling	Combined Mixed Team	22 Aug
Silver	José Mena	Weightlifting	Men's 62kg	16 Aug
Silver	Mario Gamboa	Equestrian	Jumping Individual	24 Aug
Silver	Juan Carlos Carrillo	Boxing	Men's Middle 75kg	25 Aug

== Athletics ==
=== Boys ===
Track and Road Events

Athletes	Event	Qualification		Final	
Athletes	Event	Result	Rank	Result	Rank
Éider Arévalo	Boys’ 10km Walk			DSQ	

=== Girls ===
Track and Road Events

Athletes	Event	Qualification		Final	
Athletes	Event	Result	Rank	Result	Rank
Yaneth Largacha	Girls’ 400m	57.44	13 qB	56.43	13

== Boxing ==
Boys

Athlete	Event	Preliminaries	Semifinals	Final	Rank
Juan Carlos Carrillo	Middleweight (75kg)		Muideen Akanji (NGR); W 5–0	Damien Hooper (AUS); L 4–12	Silver medal

== Cycling ==
Cross Country

Athlete	Event	Time	Rank	Points
Jhonnatan Botero Villegas	Boys' Cross Country	58:42	1	1
Jessica Lergada	Girls' Cross Country	57:56	18	40

Time Trial

Athlete	Event	Time	Rank	Points
Brayan Ramírez	Boys' Time Trial	4:05.58	5	12
Jessica Lergada	Girls' Time Trial	3:40.80	17	40

BMX

Athlete	Event	Seeding Round		Quarterfinals							Semifinals							Final		
Athlete	Event	Seeding Round		Run 1		Run 2		Run 3		Rank	Run 1		Run 2		Run 3		Rank	Final		
Athlete	Event	Time	Rank	Time	Rank	Time	Rank	Time	Rank	Rank	Time	Rank	Time	Rank	Time	Rank	Rank	Time	Rank	Points
David Oquendo	Boys' BMX	31.534	3	31.780	1	31.829	1	32.791	1	1 Q	32.065	2	33.132	3	33.442	2	2 Q	30.965	1	1
Jessica Lergada	Girls' BMX	49.016	20	49.470	6	49.182	7	48.139	5	6	Did not advance									40

Road Race

Athlete	Event	Time	Rank	Points
Jhonnatan Botero Villegas	Boys' Road Race	1:05:44	6	20**
Brayan Ramírez	Boys' Road Race	1:05:44	13	
David Oquendo	Boys' Road Race	1:16:48	69	

Overall

Team	Event	Cross country Pts		Time trial Pts		BMX Pts		Road race Pts	Total	Rank
Team	Event	Boys	Girls	Boys	Girls	Boys	Girls	Road race Pts	Total	Rank
Jessica Lergada; Jhonnatan Botero Villegas; Brayan Ramírez; David Oquendo	Mixed Team	1	40	12	40	1	40	20**	154	Gold medal

- * Received −5 for finishing road race with all three racers, received −10 for finishing road race with two cyclists in the Top 16

== Diving ==
Boys

Athlete	Event	Preliminary		Final	
Athlete	Event	Points	Rank	Points	Rank
Miguel Angel Reyes	Boys’ 3m Springboard	502.20	7 Q	521.95	8

== Equestrian ==
Athlete	Horse	Event	Round 1			Round 2			Total	Jump-Off		Rank
Athlete	Horse	Event	Penalties		Rank	Penalties		Rank	Total	Penalties	Time	Rank
Athlete	Horse	Event	Jump	Time	Rank	Jump	Time	Rank	Total	Penalties	Time	Rank
Mario Gamboa	LH Titan	Individual Jumping	0	0	1	0	0	1	0	14	1:00.63	Silver medal
Guilherme Foroni (BRA); Maria Victoria Paz (ARG); Alberto Schwalm (CHI); Mario Gamboa (COL); Marcelo Chirico (URU)	The Hec Man; Glen Haven Accolade; Stoneleigh Eddie; LH Titan; Links Hot Gossip	Team Jumping	~~16~~; ~~12~~; 8; 4; 0	~~0~~; ~~0~~; 0; 0; 0	4	0; ~~16~~; ~~16~~; 0; 4	0; ~~0~~; ~~0~~; 0; 0	2	16			5

== Gymnastics ==
=== Artistic Gymnastics ===
Girls

Athlete	Event	Vault		Uneven Bars		Beam		Floor		Total	
Athlete	Event	Score	Rank	Score	Rank	Score	Rank	Score	Rank	Score	Rank
Eliana Rodriguez	Girls' Qualification	12.150	40	11.100	30	12.200	30	10.850	37	46.300	32

== Swimming ==
Athletes	Event	Heat		Semifinal		Final	
Athletes	Event	Time	Position	Time	Position	Time	Position
Juan Manuel Arbelaez	Boys' 50m Freestyle	24.12	12	Did not advance			
Juan Manuel Arbelaez	Boys' 100m Freestyle	53.08	33	Did not advance			
Juan Manuel Arbelaez	Boys' 50m Butterfly	26.64	14 Q	26.31	11	Did not advance	
Juan Manuel Arbelaez	Boys' 100m Butterfly	58.37	28	Did not advance			
Isabella Arcila	Girls' 50m Freestyle	27.04	15 Q	29.77	16	Did not advance	
Isabella Arcila	Girls' 100m Freestyle	58.49	18	Did not advance			
Isabella Arcila	Girls' 50m Backstroke	30.05	5 Q	30.42	9 Q*	30.31	7
Isabella Arcila	Girls' 100m Backstroke	1:04.87	14 Q	1:04.98	13	Did not advance	
Isabella Arcila	Girls' 200m Backstroke	2:18.71	15			Did not advance	
Juanita Barreto	Girls' 100m Freestyle	59.45	30	Did not advance			
Juanita Barreto	Girls' 200m Freestyle	2:10.35	32			Did not advance	
Juanita Barreto	Girls' 50m Backstroke	30.48	9 Q	30.76	10	Did not advance	
Juanita Barreto	Girls' 100m Backstroke	1:04.47	7 Q	1:04.64	12	Did not advance	
Juanita Barreto	Girls' 200m Backstroke	2:18.66	13			Did not advance	
Juanita Barreto	Girls' 200m Individual Medley	DSQ				Did not advance	

- * qualified due to a withdrawal of another swimmer

== Taekwondo ==
Athlete	Event	Preliminary	Quarterfinal	Semifinal	Final	Rank
Óscar Muñoz	Boys' −55kg	Ebrahim Ahmen (BRN); W 10–7	Quoc Cuong Nguyen (VIE); L 3–4	Did not advance		5

== Tennis ==
Singles

Athlete	Event	Round 1	Round 2	Quarterfinals	Semifinals	Final	Rank
Juan Sebastián Gómez	Boys' Singles	King (BAR); W 2–0 (6–3, 6–2)	Vesely (CZE); W 2–0 (7–6, 7–5)	Golding (GBR); W 2–0 (6–4, 6–0)	Baluda (RUS); W 2–1 (6–1, 3–6, 7–5)	Bhambri (IND); W 2–1 (6–7, 7–6, 4–1RET)	Gold medal

Doubles

Athlete	Event	Round 1	Quarterfinals	Semifinals	Final	Rank
Duilio Beretta (PER); Juan Sebastián Gómez (COL)	Boys' Doubles	Acosta (ECU); Quiroz (ECU); L 0–2 (0–6, 6–7)	Did not advance			

== Triathlon ==
Girls

Triathlete	Event	Swimming	Transit 1	Cycling	Transit 2	Running	Total time	Rank
Viviana González	Individual	10:06	0:37	33:48	0:30	23:49	1:08:50.22	25

Men's

Athlete	Event	Swim (1.5 km)	Trans 1	Bike (40 km)	Trans 2	Run (10 km)	Total	Rank
Andres Diaz	Individual	9:03	0:30	29:40	0:24	18:51	58:28.67	23

Mixed

Athlete	Event	Total Times per Athlete (Swim 250 m, Bike 7 km, Run 1.7 km)	Total Group Time	Rank
Andrea Arenas (VEN); Gabriel Zumbado (CRC); Viviana González (COL); Andres Diaz (COL)	Mixed Team Relay; Americas 4	23:17; 20:44; 23:30; 20:21	1:27:52.84	14

== Weightlifting ==
Athlete	Event	Snatch	Clean & Jerk	Total	Rank
José Mena	Boys' 62kg	107	140	247	Silver medal
Jose Miguel Velez	Boys' 85kg	130	152	282	5
Diana Cadena	Girls' 53kg	71	90	161	5

== Wrestling ==
Freestyle

Athlete	Event	Pools		Final	Rank
Athlete	Event	Groups	Rank	Final	Rank
Yerzon Hernandez	Boys' 54kg	Guluyev (AZE); L 0–2 (0–5, 1–2)	2	3rd place match Daylak (TUR); L 0–2 (2–6, 1–3)	4
Yerzon Hernandez	Boys' 54kg	Lawrence (AUS); W 2–0 (3–0, 3–1)	2	3rd place match Daylak (TUR); L 0–2 (2–6, 1–3)	4
Yerzon Hernandez	Boys' 54kg	Leung (SIN); W T.Fall (6–0, 7–0)	2	3rd place match Daylak (TUR); L 0–2 (2–6, 1–3)	4
Sayury Canon	Girls' 52kg	Yuan (CHN); L 0–2 (0–3, 0–6)	3	5th place match Azzouz (ALG); W Fall (4–0)	5
Sayury Canon	Girls' 52kg	Lovik (NOR); W 2–0 (3–2, 3–1)	3	5th place match Azzouz (ALG); W Fall (4–0)	5
Sayury Canon	Girls' 52kg	Nugyen (VIE); L 0–2 (0–1, 0–1)	3	5th place match Azzouz (ALG); W Fall (4–0)	5

Greco-Roman

Athlete	Event	Pools		Final	Rank
Athlete	Event	Groups	Rank	Final	Rank
Carlos Valor	Boys' 69kg	Nedashkouski (BLR); L 0–2 (0–5, 0–3)	3	5th place match Ouakali (ALG); L 0–2 (1–2, 1–2)	6
Carlos Valor	Boys' 69kg	Kandybayev (KAZ); L 0–2 (0–7, 0–3)	3	5th place match Ouakali (ALG); L 0–2 (1–2, 1–2)	6
Carlos Valor	Boys' 69kg	Gonzalez (NCA); W Fall (5–0, 6–0)	3	5th place match Ouakali (ALG); L 0–2 (1–2, 1–2)	6
