= Algeria at the 2010 Summer Youth Olympics =

- IOC code: ALG
- NOC: Comité Olympique Algérien

in Singapore
- Competitors: 21 in 10 sports
- Flag bearer: Oussama Sahnoune
- Medals: Gold 0 Silver 0 Bronze 0 Total 0

Summer Youth Olympics appearances (overview)
- 2010; 2014; 2018; 2026

Algeria participated in the 2010 Summer Youth Olympics in Singapore.

The Algerian team consisted of 21 athletes competing in 10 sports: Athletics, Badminton, Equestrian, Gymnastics, Judo, Sailing, Swimming, Table Tennis, Weightlifting and Wrestling.

== Medalists ==
Medal	Name	Sport	Event	Date
Bronze	Zakaria Hamici	Equestrian	Team Jumping	20 Aug

== Athletics ==
=== Boys ===
Track and Road Events

Athletes	Event	Qualification		Final	
Athletes	Event	Result	Rank	Result	Rank
Amin Cheniti	Boys' 3000m	8:54.43	17 qB	8:32.85	14
Sofiane Amour	Boys' 400m Hurdles	54.79	15 qC	54.47	13
Bilal Tabti	Boys' 2000m Steeplechase	5:56.21	5 Q	5:44.34	4
Tewfik Yesref	Boys' 10km Walk			45:38.46	6

=== Girls ===
Track and Road Events

Athletes	Event	Qualification		Final	
Athletes	Event	Result	Rank	Result	Rank
Nabila Madoui	Girls' 2000m Steeplechase	7:29.32	14 qB	7:14.34	13
Zouina Benamsili	Girls' 5km Walk			DNF	

== Badminton ==
Boys

Athlete	Event	Group Stage				Knock-Out Stage			
Athlete	Event	Match 1	Match 2	Match 3	Rank	Quarterfinal	Semifinal	Final	Rank
Mohamed Abderahim Belarbi	Boys’ Singles	Fransman (NED) L 0-2 (14-21, 16-21)	Elsayad (EGY) L 0-2 (16-21, 20-22)	Huang (CHN) L 0-2 (9-21, 11-21)	4	Did not advance			

== Equestrian ==
Athlete	Horse	Event	Round 1			Round 2			Total	Jump-Off		Rank
Athlete	Horse	Event	Penalties		Rank	Penalties		Rank	Total	Penalties	Time	Rank
Athlete	Horse	Event	Jump	Time	Rank	Jump	Time	Rank	Total	Penalties	Time	Rank
Zakaria Hamici	APH Mr Sheen	Individual Jumping	4	0	10	8	1	23	13			20
Yara Hanssen (ZIM); Zakaria Hamici (ALG); Adbulaldim Mlitan (LBA); Mohamed Abdalla (EGY); Samantha McIntosh (RSA)	AP Akermanis; APH Mr Sheen; Belcam Hinnerk; Buzzword; Little Miss Sunshine	Team Jumping	~~12~~; ~~12~~; 4; 0; 0	~~0~~; ~~0~~; 0; 0; 0	1	~~16~~; ~~8~~; 0; 4; 0	~~0~~; ~~1~~; 0; 0; 0	2	8	~~9~~; 8; 8; 8; ~~DNS~~	~~1:03.57~~; 47.48; 55.59; 54.39; ~~DNS~~	Bronze medal

== Gymnastics ==
=== Artistic Gymnastics ===
Boys

Athlete	Event	Floor		Pommel Horse		Rings		Vault		Parallel Bars		Horizontal Bar		Total	
Athlete	Event	Score	Rank	Score	Rank	Score	Rank	Score	Rank	Score	Rank	Score	Rank	Score	Rank
Naimi Mechkour	Boys' Qualification	12.850	30	10.450	38	11.250	39	14.700	34	11.100	38	12.200	36	72.550	39

Girls

Athlete	Event	Vault		Uneven Bars		Beam		Floor		Total	
Athlete	Event	Score	Rank	Score	Rank	Score	Rank	Score	Rank	Score	Rank
Nardjes Terkmane	Girls' Qualification	12.150	41	-		11.250	37	10.850	36	34.250	42

== Judo ==
Individual

Athlete	Event	Round 1	Round 2	Round 3	Semifinals	Final	Rank
Athlete	Event	Opposition Result	Opposition Result	Opposition Result	Opposition Result	Opposition Result	Rank
Sana Khelifi	Girls' -78 kg	BYE	Potocnik (SLO); L 000-001	Repechage; Tuba (SRB); L 000-100	did not advance		9

Team

Team	Event	Round 1	Round 2	Semifinals	Final	Rank
Team	Event	Opposition Result	Opposition Result	Opposition Result	Opposition Result	Rank
Paris; Barbara Batizi (HUN); Patrick Marxer (LIE); Maja Rasinska (POL); Farshid Ghasemi Asl (IRI); Sophina Arrey (CMR); Khasan Khalmurzaev (RUS); Sana Khelifi (ALG); Fernando Vanoye (MEX)	Mixed Team	Tokyo; L 3-5	did not advance			9

== Sailing ==
One Person Dinghy

Athlete	Event	Race												Points	Rank
Athlete	Event	1	2	3	4	5	6	7	8	9	10	11	M*	Points	Rank
Lamia Feriel Hammiche	Girls' Byte CII	28	28	28	19	~~29~~	28	~~30~~	29	24	29	29	27	269	29

Windsurfing

Athlete	Event	Race											Points	Rank
Athlete	Event	1	2	3	4	5	6	7	8	9	10	M*	Points	Rank
Omar Noureddine Bouabdallah	Boys' Techno 293	16	14	17	~~DNF~~	~~RAF~~	8	12	OCS	11	19	14	155	17

== Swimming ==
Athletes	Event	Heat		Semifinal		Final	
Athletes	Event	Time	Position	Time	Position	Time	Position
Oussama Sahnoune	Boys’ 50m Freestyle	23.90	15 Q	23.95	15	Did not advance	
Oussama Sahnoune	Boys’ 100m Freestyle	52.54	26	Did not advance			
Amel Melih	Girls’ 50m Freestyle	28.23	32	Did not advance			
Amel Melih	Girls’ 50m Backstroke	31.75	16 Q	31.82	16	Did not advance	

== Table Tennis ==
Individual

Athlete	Event	Round 1		Round 2		Quarterfinals	Semifinals	Final	Rank
Athlete	Event	Group Matches	Rank	Group Matches	Rank	Quarterfinals	Semifinals	Final	Rank
Islem Laid	Girls' Singles	Xiao (POR); L 0-3 (5-11, 7-11, 7-11)	4 qB	Loveridge (GBR); L 0-3 (8-11, 8-11, 10-12)	4	Did not advance			29
Islem Laid	Girls' Singles	Nagyvaradi (HUN); L 0-3 (5-11, 11-13, 1-11)	4 qB	Giardi (SMR); L 0-3 (wd)	4	Did not advance			29
Islem Laid	Girls' Singles	Sawettabut (THA); L 0-3 (5-11, 3-11, 1-11)	4 qB	Cordero (PUR); W 3-2 (11-7, 5-11, 9-11, 11-8, 11-9)	4	Did not advance			29

Team

Athlete	Event	Round 1		Round 2	Quarterfinals	Semifinals	Final	Rank
Athlete	Event	Group Matches	Rank	Round 2	Quarterfinals	Semifinals	Final	Rank
Africa 1 Islem Laid (ALG); Ojo Onaolapo (NGR)	Mixed Team	Egypt; Meshref (EGY); Bedair (EGY); L 1-2 (0-3, 2-3, 3-0)	4 qB	Pan America 1 Hsing (USA); Gavilan (PAR); L 0-2 (wd)	Did not advance			25
Africa 1 Islem Laid (ALG); Ojo Onaolapo (NGR)	Mixed Team	Intercontinental 2 Noskova (RUS); Holikov (UZB); L 1-2 (0-3, 3-0, 0-3)	4 qB	Pan America 1 Hsing (USA); Gavilan (PAR); L 0-2 (wd)	Did not advance			25
Africa 1 Islem Laid (ALG); Ojo Onaolapo (NGR)	Mixed Team	Singapore; Li (SIN); Chew (SIN); L 1-2 (0-3, 3-1, 0-3)	4 qB	Pan America 1 Hsing (USA); Gavilan (PAR); L 0-2 (wd)	Did not advance			25

== Weightlifting ==
Athlete	Event	Snatch	Clean & Jerk	Overall	Rank
Housseyn Fardjallah	Boys' 69kg	115	140	255	6

== Wrestling ==
Freestyle

Athlete	Event	Pools		Final	Rank
Athlete	Event	Groups	Rank	Final	Rank
Mohamed Boudraa	Boys' 63kg	Kadirov (TJK); L T.Fall (0–6, 0–7)	3	5th Place Match; Pilay (ECU); L 0–3 (0–1, 0–3)	6
Mohamed Boudraa	Boys' 63kg	Murphy (USA); L T. Fall (0–7, 0–7)	3	5th Place Match; Pilay (ECU); L 0–3 (0–1, 0–3)	6
Mohamed Boudraa	Boys' 63kg	Pereira (GBS); W 2–1 (5–3, 0–7, 1+-1)	3	5th Place Match; Pilay (ECU); L 0–3 (0–1, 0–3)	6
Sarina Azzouz	Girls' 52kg	Bagomedova (AZE); L T. Fall (0–7, 0–6)	3	5th Place Match; Canon (COL); L Fall (0–4)	6
Sarina Azzouz	Girls' 52kg	Eustaquio (GUM); W 2–0 (1–0, 7–0)	3	5th Place Match; Canon (COL); L Fall (0–4)	6
Sarina Azzouz	Girls' 52kg	Gadaeva (UZB); L 0–2 (0–6, 0–4)	3	5th Place Match; Canon (COL); L Fall (0–4)	6

Greco-Roman

Athlete	Event	Pools		Final	Rank
Athlete	Event	Groups	Rank	Final	Rank
Amine Boughazi	Boys' 50kg	Sulaimanov (KGZ); L 0–2 (0–6, 0–1)	3	5th Place Match; Pikuza (BLR); L Fall (0–9)	6
Amine Boughazi	Boys' 50kg	Gundersen (NOR); W 2–0 (5–1, 4–3)	3	5th Place Match; Pikuza (BLR); L Fall (0–9)	6
Amine Boughazi	Boys' 50kg	Khaqqilov (UZB); L 0–2 (4–9, 2–4)	3	5th Place Match; Pikuza (BLR); L Fall (0–9)	6
Abdelkrim Ouakali	Boys' 69kg	Ghaderian (IRI); L 1–2 (0–2, 5–0, 0-2)	3	5th Place Match; Valor (COL); W 2–0 (2–1, 2–1)	5
Abdelkrim Ouakali	Boys' 69kg	Darwish (SYR); W Fall (5–0)	3	5th Place Match; Valor (COL); W 2–0 (2–1, 2–1)	5
Abdelkrim Ouakali	Boys' 69kg	Gedik (TUR); L 1–2 (1–2, 5–0, 0-2)	3	5th Place Match; Valor (COL); W 2–0 (2–1, 2–1)	5
