= South Africa at the 2010 Summer Youth Olympics =

- IOC code: RSA
- NOC: South African Sports Confederation and Olympic Committee

in Singapore
- Competitors: 62 (28 men, 34 women) in 13 sports
- Flag bearer: Wanda Matshaya
- Medals Ranked 20th: Gold 2 Silver 4 Bronze 3 Total 9

Summer Youth Olympics appearances
- 2010; 2014; 2018; 2026

South Africa competed at the 2010 Summer Youth Olympics, the inaugural Youth Olympic Games, held in Singapore from 14 August to 26 August 2010. The nation was represented by the South Africa Olympic Committee, which sent a total of sixty-two athletes to compete in thirteen sports. The flagbearer at the opening ceremony for the nation was fencer Wanda Matshaya.

== Medalists ==
The following South African athletes won medals at the Games, all dates shown are August 2010. In the results sections below, medallists' names are emboldened. Names that italicised were a part of a Mixed NOC Event and do not count towards overall medal count.

| Medal | Name | Sport | Event | Date |
|---|---|---|---|---|
| Gold | Chad le Clos | Swimming | Youth men's 200 m medley | 16th |
| Gold | Jacques Du Plessis | Athletics | Boys' discus throw | 21st |
| Silver | Chad le Clos | Swimming | Youth men's 400 m freestyle | 15th |
| Silver | Chad le Clos | Swimming | Youth men's 100 m butterfly | 16th |
| Silver | Chad le Clos | Swimming | Youth men's 200 m butterfly | 20th |
| Silver | Ruan Greyling | Athletics | Boys' 400 m | 21st |
| Silver | Izelle Neuhoff | Athletics | Girls' Medley Relay | 23rd |
| Bronze | Dylan Bosch | Swimming | Youth men's 200 m medley | 16th |
| Bronze | Chad le Clos; Murray McDougall; Dylan Bosch; Peter Keune | Swimming | Youth men's 4 × 100 m freestyle relay | 16th |
| Bronze | Samantha McIntosh | Equestrian | Team Jumping | 20th |
| Bronze | Rudolph Pienaar | Athletics | Boys' long jump | 22nd |

== Athletics ==
=== Boys ===
Track and Road Events

| Athletes | Event | Qualification | | Final | |
| Athletes | Event | Result | Rank | Result | Rank |
|---|---|---|---|---|---|
| Siphelo Ngquboza | Boys’ 200m | 22.75 | 17 qC | DNS | |
| Ruan Greyling | Boys’ 400m | 47.60 | 5 Q | 47.22 | Silver medal |
| Schalk Burger | Boys’ 400m Hurdles | 53.22 | 9 qB | 52.39 | 7 |
| Tinashe Samuel Mutanga (ZIM); Okeudo Jonathan Nmaju (NGR); Alphas Kishoyian (KEN); Ruan Greyling (RSA) | Boys’ Medley Relay | | | 1:53.45 | 4 |

Field Events

| Athletes | Event | Qualification | | Final | |
| Athletes | Event | Result | Rank | Result | Rank |
|---|---|---|---|---|---|
| Frans Schutte | Boys’ Shot Put | 20.24 | 4 Q | NM | |
| Jacques Du Plessis | Boys’ Discus Throw | 63.17 | 2 Q | 63.94 | Gold medal |
| Dylan Jacobs | Boys’ Javelin Throw | 71.92 | 6 Q | 72.33 | 4 |
| Stiaan Minnie | Boys’ Hammer Throw | 62.31 | 13 qB | 63.30 | 14 |
| Rudolph Pienaar | Boys’ Long Jump | 7.28 | 6 Q | 7.53 | Bronze medal |
| Migael Celliers | Boys’ Pole Vault | 4.45 | 13 qB | 4.60 | 9 |

=== Girls ===
Track and Road Events

| Athletes | Event | Qualification | | Final | |
| Athletes | Event | Result | Rank | Result | Rank |
|---|---|---|---|---|---|
| Izelle Neuhoff | Girls’ 400m | 55.01 | 7 Q | 56.27 | 8 |
| Thato Makhafola | Girls’ 1000m | 2:52.92 | 11 Q | 2:52.65 | 8 |
| Kayla Gilbert | Girls’ 100m Hurdles | 14.19 | 10 qB | 14.03 | 10 |
| Josephine Omaka (NGR); Nkiruka Florence Nwakwe (NGR); Izelle Neuhoff (RSA); Bukola Abogunloko (NGR) | Girls’ Medley Relay | | | 2:06.19 | Silver medal |

Field Events

| Athletes | Event | Qualification | | Final | |
| Athletes | Event | Result | Rank | Result | Rank |
|---|---|---|---|---|---|
| Simone Meyer | Girls’ Discus Throw | 48.03 | 2 Q | 46.62 | 4 |
| Maryke Brits | Girls’ Long Jump | 5.88 | 7 Q | 5.71 | 8 |
| Valentina Da Rocha | Girls’ Triple Jump | DNS qB | | DNS | |

== Basketball ==
Boys

| Squad List | Event | Group Stage | | Placement Stage | | | Rank |
| Squad List | Event | Group D | Rank | 17th-20th | | | Rank |
|---|---|---|---|---|---|---|---|
| Nkosinathi Festile; Justin Paton (C); Duke Lazarus; Siyabonga Mahlinza | Boys' Basketball | Virgin Islands; L 12-28 | 5 | Singapore; L 12-21 | India; L 11-27 | Panama; W 21-13 | 19 |
| Nkosinathi Festile; Justin Paton (C); Duke Lazarus; Siyabonga Mahlinza | Boys' Basketball | Spain; L 5-33 | 5 | Singapore; L 12-21 | India; L 11-27 | Panama; W 21-13 | 19 |
| Nkosinathi Festile; Justin Paton (C); Duke Lazarus; Siyabonga Mahlinza | Boys' Basketball | Croatia; L 4-33 | 5 | Singapore; L 12-21 | India; L 11-27 | Panama; W 21-13 | 19 |
| Nkosinathi Festile; Justin Paton (C); Duke Lazarus; Siyabonga Mahlinza | Boys' Basketball | Philippines; L 12-26 | 5 | Singapore; L 12-21 | India; L 11-27 | Panama; W 21-13 | 19 |

Qualifying Round – Group D

| Team | Pld | W | L | PF | PA | PD | Pts |
|---|---|---|---|---|---|---|---|
| Croatia | 4 | 4 | 0 | 111 | 67 | +44 | 8 |
| Spain | 4 | 3 | 1 | 104 | 70 | +34 | 7 |
| Virgin Islands | 4 | 2 | 2 | 90 | 84 | +6 | 6 |
| Philippines | 4 | 1 | 3 | 98 | 95 | +3 | 5 |
| South Africa | 4 | 0 | 4 | 33 | 120 | −87 | 4 |

Qualified for quarterfinals
9th–16th placement games
17th–20th placement games

15 August
12:30

Game 15

| South Africa | 12–28 | Virgin Islands |
Scoring by quarter: 18–2, 28-12
| Pts: Mahlinza 6 Rebs: Mahlinza 5 | | Pts: Jones, Swanston 10; Rebs: Swanston 7 Asts: Jones, Swanston 2 |

*scape Youth Space
Referees: Naftal Chongo (Mozambique), Elif Inci (Turkey)

16 August
12:30

Game 31

| South Africa | 5–33 | Spain |
Scoring by quarter: 4–15, 5–33
| Pts: Mahlinza 3 Rebs: Mahlinza 3 | | Pts: Costa 12; Rebs: Motos 9 Asts: Costa 5 |

*scape Youth Space
Referees: Gabriel White (MNP?), Yoko Tomita (Japan)

17 August
10:30

Game 39

| Croatia | 33–4 | South Africa |
Scoring by quarter: 15–2, 33–4
| Pts: Krstanovic 12; Rebs: Krstanovic 9 Asts: Buovac 2 | | Pts: Festile, Mahlinza 2 Rebs: Lazarus 3 |

*scape Youth Space
Referees: David Musard (Switzerland), Kim Bohui (South Korea)

19 August
10:30

Game 71

| South Africa | 12–26 | Philippines |
Scoring by quarter: 2–18, 12–26
| Pts: Mahlinza 6 Rebs: Mahlinza 10; Asts: Paton 1 | | Pts: Teng 11; Rebs: Pate 5 Asts: Tolomia 2 |

*scape Youth Space
Referees: Joseph Bissang (France), Robert Lottermoser (Germany)

17th–20th placement matches

| Team | Pld | W | L | PF | PA | PD | Pts |
|---|---|---|---|---|---|---|---|
| Singapore | 3 | 3 | 0 | 85 | 52 | +33 | 6 |
| India | 3 | 2 | 1 | 75 | 64 | +11 | 5 |
| South Africa | 3 | 1 | 2 | 44 | 61 | –25 | 4 |
| Panama | 3 | 0 | 3 | 55 | 82 | –27 | 3 |

21 August
9:30

Game 83

| Singapore | 21–12 | South Africa |
Scoring by quarter: 15–8, 21–12
| Pts: Su 7 Rebs: Liew 7 Asts: Su, Liew, Low 1 | | Pts: Festile 5 Rebs: Mahlinza 13; Asts: Festile 2 |

*scape Youth Space
Referees: Alexy Davydov (Russia), Alejandro Sanchez Varela (Uruguay)

22 August
9:00

Game 101

| South Africa | 11–27 | India |
Scoring by quarter: 3–11, 11–27
| Pts: Paton 5 Rebs: Mahlinza 9 Asts: Festile 1 | | Pts: Gowasni 9 Rebs: Kanarjee 7 Asts: Sunder 1 |

*scape Youth Space
Referees: Flavia Almeida (Brazil), Kim Bohui (South Korea)

23 August
9:30

Game 123

| South Africa | 21–13 | Panama |
Scoring by quarter: 11–6, 21–13, Third quarter score
| Pts: Festile 11; Rebs: Lazarus 4 Asts: Lazarus, Festile, Mahlinza 1 | | Pts: Grenald 8 Rebs: Grant 10; Asts: Grenald, Grant 1 |

*scape Youth Space
Referees: Robert Lottermoser (Germany), Joseph Bissang (France)

== Canoeing ==
Boys

| Athlete | Event | Time Trial | | Round 1 | Round 2 (Rep) | Round 3 | Round 4 | Round 5 | Final |
| Athlete | Event | Time | Rank | Round 1 | Round 2 (Rep) | Round 3 | Round 4 | Round 5 | Final |
|---|---|---|---|---|---|---|---|---|---|
| Luke Stowman | Boys’ K1 Slalom | 1:44.58 | 14 | Garcia (ESP); L 1:54.67-1:38.08 | Tsarykovich (BLR); W 1:42.91-1:48.48 | Smith (AUS); L 1:46.22-1:31.65 | Did not advance | | |
| Luke Stowman | Boys’ K1 Sprint | 1:40.34 | 18 | Zelnychenko (UKR); L 1:39.46-1:32.91 | Silva (STP); W 1:40.35-1:44.31 | Did not advance | | | |

Girls

| Athlete | Event | Time Trial | | Round 1 | Round 2 (Rep) | Round 3 | Round 4 | Round 5 | Final |
| Athlete | Event | Time | Rank | Round 1 | Round 2 (Rep) | Round 3 | Round 4 | Round 5 | Final |
|---|---|---|---|---|---|---|---|---|---|
| Kerry Segal | Girls’ K1 Slalom | 2:03.42 | 20 | Denhollander (CAN); L 2:01.86-1:43.47 | Huang (CHN); L 1:59.67-1:58.94 | Did not advance | | | |
| Kerry Segal | Girls’ K1 Sprint | 1:47.11 | 11 | Pedroso (POR); W 1:45.66-1:47.64 | | Pedroso (POR); W 1:46.38-1:48.35 | Farkasdi (HUN); L 1:52.97-1:44.14 | Did not advance | |

== Cycling ==
Cross Country

| Athlete | Event | Time | Rank | Points |
|---|---|---|---|---|
| Luke Roberts | Boys’ Cross Country | 1:04:30 | 17 | 72 |
| Teagan O'Keeffe | Girls’ Cross Country | -2LAP | 23 | 40 |

Time Trial

| Athlete | Event | Time | Rank | Points |
|---|---|---|---|---|
| Jayde Julius | Boys’ Time Trial | 4:19.85 | 21 | 30 |
| Teagan O'Keeffe | Girls’ Time Trial | 3:42.09 | 19 | 40 |

BMX

| Athlete | Event | Seeding Round | | Quarterfinals | | | | | | | Semifinals | | | | | | | Final | | |
| Athlete | Event | Seeding Round | | Run 1 | | Run 2 | | Run 3 | | Rank | Run 1 | | Run 2 | | Run 3 | | Rank | Final | | |
| Athlete | Event | Time | Rank | Time | Rank | Time | Rank | Time | Rank | Rank | Time | Rank | Time | Rank | Time | Rank | Rank | Time | Rank | Points |
|---|---|---|---|---|---|---|---|---|---|---|---|---|---|---|---|---|---|---|---|---|
| Lunga Mkhize | Boys’ BMX | 35.189 | 20 | 34.749 | 5 | 35.075 | 5 | 37.670 | 4 | 5 | Did not advance | | | | | | | | | 72 |
| Teagan O'Keeffe | Girls’ BMX | 37.360 | 4 | 37.453 | 1 | 37.943 | 1 | 37.477 | 1 | 1 Q | 38.019 | 2 | 39.182 | 3 | 38.039 | 1 | 2 Q | 36.982 | 4 | 12 |

Road Race

| Athlete | Event | Time | Rank | Points |
|---|---|---|---|---|
| Jayde Julius | Boys’ Road Race | 1:05:44 | 5 | 30 |
| Luke Roberts | Boys’ Road Race | 1:05:44 | 42 | |
| Lunga Mkhize | Boys’ Road Race | DNF | | |

Overall

| Team | Event | Cross Country Pts | | Time Trial Pts | | BMX Pts | | Road Race Pts | Total | Rank |
| Team | Event | Boys | Girls | Boys | Girls | Boys | Girls | Road Race Pts | Total | Rank |
|---|---|---|---|---|---|---|---|---|---|---|
| Teagan O'Keeffe; Luke Roberts; Jayde Julius; Lunga Mkhize | Mixed Team | 72 | 40 | 30 | 40 | 72 | 12 | 30 | 296 | 14 |

== Equestrian ==
| Athlete | Horse | Event | Round 1 | | | Round 2 | | | Total | Jump-Off | | Rank |
| Athlete | Horse | Event | Penalties | | Rank | Penalties | | Rank | Total | Penalties | Time | Rank |
| Athlete | Horse | Event | Jump | Time | Rank | Jump | Time | Rank | Total | Penalties | Time | Rank |
|---|---|---|---|---|---|---|---|---|---|---|---|---|
| Samantha McIntosh | Little Miss Sunshine | Individual Jumping | 0 | 0 | 1 | 4 | 0 | 8 | 4 | 0 | 40.32 | 4 |
| Yara Hanssen (ZIM); Zakaria Hamici (ALG); Abduladim Mlitan (LBA); Mohamed Abdalla (EGY); Samantha McIntosh (RSA) | AP Akermanis; APH Mr Sheen; Belcam Hinnerk; Buzzword; Little Miss Sunshine | Team Jumping | ~~12~~; ~~12~~; 4; 0; 0 | ~~0~~; ~~0~~; 0; 0; 0 | 1 | ~~16~~; ~~8~~; 0; 4; 0 | ~~0~~; ~~1~~; 0; 0; 0 | 2 | 8 | ~~9~~; 8; 8; 8; ~~DNS~~ | ~~1:03.57~~; 47.48; 55.59; 54.39; ~~DNS~~ | Bronze medal |

== Fencing ==
Group Stage

| Athlete | Event | Match 1 | Match 2 | Match 3 | Match 4 | Match 5 | Seed |
|---|---|---|---|---|---|---|---|
| Wanda Matshaya | Girls’ Épée | Tataran (ROU); L 3-5 | Bakhareva (RUS); L 1-5 | Lee (KOR); L 2-5 | Radford (GBR); W 5-4 | Tella (ARG); L 3-5 | 11 |

Knock-Out Stage

| Athlete | Event | Round of 16 | Quarterfinals | Semifinals | Final | Rank |
|---|---|---|---|---|---|---|
| Wanda Matshaya | Girls’ Épée | Tataran (ROU); L 10-15 | Did not advance | | | 11 |
| Africa; Mennatalla Yasser Ahmed (EGY); Saleh Saleh (EGY); Menatalla Daw (EGY); Ziad Elsissy (EGY); Wanda Matshaya (RSA); Mostafa Mahmoud (EGY) | Mixed Team | Americas 2 L 25-28 | Did not advance | | | 9 |

== Gymnastics ==
=== Artistic Gymnastics ===
Boys

| Athlete | Event | Floor | | Pommel Horse | | Rings | | Vault | | Parallel Bars | | Horizontal Bar | | Total | |
| Athlete | Event | Score | Rank | Score | Rank | Score | Rank | Score | Rank | Score | Rank | Score | Rank | Score | Rank |
|---|---|---|---|---|---|---|---|---|---|---|---|---|---|---|---|
| Ryan Patterson | Boys' Qualification | 12.800 | 31 | 11.350 | 35 | 12.850 | 29 | 14.700 | 32 | 13.050 | 23 | 12.950 | 26 | 77.700 | 33 |

Girls

| Athlete | Event | Vault | | Uneven Bars | | Beam | | Floor | | Total | |
| Athlete | Event | Score | Rank | Score | Rank | Score | Rank | Score | Rank | Score | Rank |
|---|---|---|---|---|---|---|---|---|---|---|---|
| Claudia Cummins | Girls' Qualification | 13.100 | 27 | 11.200 | 28 | 11.900 | 34 | 12.800 | 12 | 49.000 | 27 |

=== Rhythmic Gymnastics ===
Individual

| Athlete | Event | Qualification | | | | | | Final | | | | | |
| Athlete | Event | Rope | Hoop | Ball | Clubs | Total | Rank | Rope | Hoop | Ball | Clubs | Total | Rank |
|---|---|---|---|---|---|---|---|---|---|---|---|---|---|
| Aimee van Rooyen | Girls' Individual All-Around | 20.450 | 20.850 | 20.350 | 21.250 | 82.900 | 14 | Did not advance | | | | | |

=== Trampoline ===
| Athlete | Event | Qualification | | | | Final | |
| Athlete | Event | Routine 1 | Routine 2 | Total | Rank | Routine 1 | Rank |
|---|---|---|---|---|---|---|---|
| Reinhard Huisamen | Boys' Trampoline | 24.500 | 3.600 | 28.100 | 12 | Did not advance | |
| Iolanthea Louw | Girls' Trampoline | 21.900 | 18.800 | 40.700 | 11 | Did not advance | |

== Field hockey ==
| Squad List | Event | Group Stage | | 5th Place Match | |
| Squad List | Event | Opposition Score | Rank | Opposition Score | Rank |
|---|---|---|---|---|---|
| Phumelela Mbande; Sinethemba Zungu; Toni-Leigh van Niekerk; Kirsty Ann Gibbings; Keisha Arnolds; Charne van Biljon; Jenna-Leigh du Preez (C); Bronwyn Kretzmann; Tiffany Jones; Sarah Ive; Jacinta Jubb; Stephanie Baxter; Hlubikazi Sipamla; Quanita Bobbs; Elan-Margo van Vught; Zimisele Shange | Girls' Hockey | Argentina; L 0-7 | 6 | (Republic of Ireland) Ireland; L 1-3 | 6 |
| Phumelela Mbande; Sinethemba Zungu; Toni-Leigh van Niekerk; Kirsty Ann Gibbings; Keisha Arnolds; Charne van Biljon; Jenna-Leigh du Preez (C); Bronwyn Kretzmann; Tiffany Jones; Sarah Ive; Jacinta Jubb; Stephanie Baxter; Hlubikazi Sipamla; Quanita Bobbs; Elan-Margo van Vught; Zimisele Shange | Girls' Hockey | Netherlands; L 0-13 | 6 | (Republic of Ireland) Ireland; L 1-3 | 6 |
| Phumelela Mbande; Sinethemba Zungu; Toni-Leigh van Niekerk; Kirsty Ann Gibbings; Keisha Arnolds; Charne van Biljon; Jenna-Leigh du Preez (C); Bronwyn Kretzmann; Tiffany Jones; Sarah Ive; Jacinta Jubb; Stephanie Baxter; Hlubikazi Sipamla; Quanita Bobbs; Elan-Margo van Vught; Zimisele Shange | Girls' Hockey | South Korea; L 1-3 | 6 | (Republic of Ireland) Ireland; L 1-3 | 6 |
| Phumelela Mbande; Sinethemba Zungu; Toni-Leigh van Niekerk; Kirsty Ann Gibbings; Keisha Arnolds; Charne van Biljon; Jenna-Leigh du Preez (C); Bronwyn Kretzmann; Tiffany Jones; Sarah Ive; Jacinta Jubb; Stephanie Baxter; Hlubikazi Sipamla; Quanita Bobbs; Elan-Margo van Vught; Zimisele Shange | Girls' Hockey | New Zealand; L 0-4 | 6 | (Republic of Ireland) Ireland; L 1-3 | 6 |
| Phumelela Mbande; Sinethemba Zungu; Toni-Leigh van Niekerk; Kirsty Ann Gibbings; Keisha Arnolds; Charne van Biljon; Jenna-Leigh du Preez (C); Bronwyn Kretzmann; Tiffany Jones; Sarah Ive; Jacinta Jubb; Stephanie Baxter; Hlubikazi Sipamla; Quanita Bobbs; Elan-Margo van Vught; Zimisele Shange | Girls' Hockey | (Republic of Ireland) Ireland; L 0-1 | 6 | (Republic of Ireland) Ireland; L 1-3 | 6 |

== Rowing ==
| Athlete | Event | Heats | | Repechage | | Semifinals | | Final | | Overall Rank |
| Athlete | Event | Time | Rank | Time | Rank | Time | Rank | Time | Rank | Overall Rank |
|---|---|---|---|---|---|---|---|---|---|---|
| Akane Makamu; Juliet Donaldson | Girls' Pair | 3:49.14 | 4 QR | 4:03.86 | 3 QA/B | 4:00.80 | 6 QB | 3:51.35 | 6 | 12 |

== Swimming ==
Boys

| Athletes | Event | Heat | | Semifinal | | Final | |
| Athletes | Event | Time | Position | Time | Position | Time | Position |
|---|---|---|---|---|---|---|---|
| Pierre Keune | Boys’ 100m Freestyle | 52.94 | 32 | Did not advance | | | |
| Chad le Clos | Boys’ 200m Freestyle | 1:52.10 | 9 | | | Did not advance | |
| Chad le Clos | Boys’ 400m Freestyle | 3:58.08 | 6 Q | | | 3:51.37 | Silver medal |
| Chad le Clos | Boys’ 100m Butterfly | 54.93 | 10 Q | 53.67 | 2 Q | 53.31 | Silver medal |
| Chad le Clos | Boys’ 200m Butterfly | 2:02.07 | 6 Q | | | 1:56.85 | Silver medal |
| Chad le Clos | Boys’ 200m Individual Medley | 2:03.12 | 2 Q | | | 2:00.68 | Gold medal |
| Murray McDougall | Boys’ 100m Backstroke | 57.43 | 6 Q | 56.67 | 4 Q | 56.68 | 5 |
| Murray McDougall | Boys’ 50m Butterfly | 25.55 | 8 Q | 25.24 | 8 Q | 25.22 | 7 |
| Dylan Bosch | Boys’ 200m Individual Medley | 2:03.20 | 3 Q | | | 2:02.59 | Bronze medal |
| Murray McDougall; Dylan Bosch; Pierre Keune; Chad le Clos | Boys’ 4 × 100 m Freestyle Relay | 3:26.98 | 2 Q | | | 3:24.66 | Bronze medal |
| Murray McDougall; Dylan Bosch; Pierre Keune; Chad le Clos | Boys’ 4 × 100 m Medley Relay | 3:48.89 | 6 Q | | | 3:45.80 | 6 |

Girls

| Athletes | Event | Heat | | Semifinal | | Final | |
| Athletes | Event | Time | Position | Time | Position | Time | Position |
|---|---|---|---|---|---|---|---|
| Kyla Ferreira | Girls’ 100m Freestyle | 59.20 | 27 | Did not advance | | | |
| Kyla Ferreira | Girls’ 200m Freestyle | 2:11.21 | 34 | | | Did not advance | |
| Natasha de Vos | Girls’ 400m Freestyle | 4:33.68 | 21 | | | Did not advance | |
| Natasha de Vos | Girls’ 200m Backstroke | 2:19.03 | 16 | | | Did not advance | |
| Oneida Cooper | Girls’ 100m Backstroke | 1:06.05 | 21 | Did not advance | | | |
| Oneida Cooper | Girls’ 200m Individual Medley | 2:27.82 | 19 | | | Did not advance | |
| Taryn Mackenzie | Girls’ 50m Breaststroke | 33.51 | 14 Q | 33.47 | 12 | Did not advance | |
| Taryn Mackenzie | Girls’ 100m Breaststroke | 1:13.46 | 16 Q | 1:13.46 | 16 | Did not advance | |
| Taryn Mackenzie | Girls’ 200m Breaststroke | 2:39.33 | 13 | | | Did not advance | |
| Kyla Ferreira; Oneida Cooper; Natasha de Vos; Taryn Mackenzie | Girls’ 4 × 100 m Freestyle Relay | 4:02.12 | 9 | | | Did not advance | |
| Kyla Ferreira; Oneida Cooper; Natasha de Vos; Taryn Mackenzie | Girls’ 4 × 100 m Medley Relay | 4:24.41 | 7 Q | | | 4:23.52 | 6 |

Mixed

| Athletes | Event | Heat | | Semifinal | | Final | |
| Athletes | Event | Time | Position | Time | Position | Time | Position |
|---|---|---|---|---|---|---|---|
| Pierre Keune; Kyla Ferreira; Murray McDougall; Natasha de Vos | Mixed 4 × 100 m Freestyle Relay | 3:43.85 | 13 | | | Did not advance | |
| Oneida Cooper; Kyla Ferreira; Dylan Bosch; Chad le Clos | Mixed 4 × 100 m Medley Relay | 4:06.14 | 9 | | | Did not advance | |

== Triathlon ==
Men's

| Athlete | Event | Swim (1.5 km) | Trans 1 | Bike (40 km) | Trans 2 | Run (10 km) | Total | Rank |
|---|---|---|---|---|---|---|---|---|
| Wian Sullwald | Individual | 9:19 | 0:31 | 29:22 | 0:26 | 16:48 | 56:26.68 | 8 |

Mixed

| Athlete | Event | Total Times per Athlete (Swim 250 m, Bike 7 km, Run 1.7 km) | Total Group Time | Rank |
|---|---|---|---|---|
| Sara Vilic (CRO); Abrahm Louw (NAM); Andrea Brown (ZIM); Wian Sullwald (RSA) | Mixed Team Relay; World Team 1 | 21:23; 19:07; 23:11; 19:56 | 1:23:37.79 | 9 |

== Weightlifting ==
| Athlete | Event | Snatch | Clean & Jerk | Total | Rank |
|---|---|---|---|---|---|
| Phello John Ramela | Boys' 56kg | 85 | 100 | 185 | 10 |

== Wrestling ==
Freestyle

| Athlete | Event | Pools | | Final | Rank |
| Athlete | Event | Groups | Rank | Final | Rank |
|---|---|---|---|---|---|
| Andries Schutte | Boys' 100kg | Dhesi (CAN); L 0–2 (0–2, 0–1) | 4 | 7th Place Match; Sualevai (ASA); W 2–0 (2–0, 4–0) | 7 |
| Andries Schutte | Boys' 100kg | Ruano (CUB); L 0–2 (3–4, 0–1) | 4 | 7th Place Match; Sualevai (ASA); W 2–0 (2–0, 4–0) | 7 |
| Andries Schutte | Boys' 100kg | Kadian (IND); L 1–2 (0–1, 1–0, 0-1) | 4 | 7th Place Match; Sualevai (ASA); W 2–0 (2–0, 4–0) | 7 |

Greco-Roman

| Athlete | Event | Pools | | Final | Rank |
| Athlete | Event | Groups | Rank | Final | Rank |
|---|---|---|---|---|---|
| Leonard Gregory | Boys' 58kg | Lytvynov (UKR); L 1–2 (0–2, 4–3, 1-2) | 4 | 7th Place Match; BYE | 7 |
| Leonard Gregory | Boys' 58kg | Camarillo (MEX); L 1–2 (0–6, 3–1, 0-3) | 4 | 7th Place Match; BYE | 7 |
| Leonard Gregory | Boys' 58kg | Suleymanov (RUS); L Fall (0–6, 0–5) | 4 | 7th Place Match; BYE | 7 |
