= Saudi Arabia at the 2010 Summer Youth Olympics =

- IOC code: KSA
- NOC: Saudi Arabian Olympic Committee

in Singapore
- Competitors: 9 in 4 sports
- Flag bearer: Abdullah Abkar
- Medals Ranked 84th: Gold 0 Silver 0 Bronze 1 Total 1

Summer Youth Olympics appearances
- 2010; 2014; 2018

Saudi Arabia participated in the 2010 Summer Youth Olympics in Singapore.

Until that point, the country did not allow women to participate in the Olympics, and had never sent a female athlete to the Olympic Games. Nonetheless, it did send one female competitor to these inaugural Youth Games: Dalma Rushdi Malhas, who competed in equestrian and won Saudi Arabia's only medal at these Games, a bronze. The International Olympic Committee had made it a requirement for every national delegation to include at least one female athlete.

== Medalists ==
Medal	Name	Sport	Event	Date
Bronze	Dalma Rushdi H Malhas	Equestrian	Jumping Individual	24 Aug

== Athletics ==
=== Boys ===
Track and Road Events

Athletes	Event	Qualification		Final	
Athletes	Event	Result	Rank	Result	Rank
Abdullah Alasiri	Boys’ 200m	22.22	13 qB	22.49	13
Abdullah Ahmed Abkar	Boys’ 400m	49.18	14 qB	48.51	13
Ibrahim Abdullah	Boys’ 3000m	8:16.33	10 Q	8:15.23	9
Ali Alghamdi	Boys’ 400m Hurdles	52.89	4 Q	DNS	
Ahmed Burhan	Boys’ 2000m Steeplechase	DSQ qB		5:48.81	9
Masaki Nashimoto (JPN); Xie Zhenye (CHN); Abdullah Ahmed Abkar (KSA); Dongbaek Choi (KOR)	Boys’ Medley Relay			1:54.14	5

Field Events

Athletes	Event	Qualification		Final	
Athletes	Event	Result	Rank	Result	Rank
Hussain Alkhalaf	Boys’ Triple Jump	14.12	13 qB	14.79	11

== Equestrian ==
Athlete	Horse	Event	Round 1			Round 2			Total	Jump-Off		Rank
Athlete	Horse	Event	Penalties		Rank	Penalties		Rank	Total	Penalties	Time	Rank
Athlete	Horse	Event	Jump	Time	Rank	Jump	Time	Rank	Total	Penalties	Time	Rank
Dalma Rushdi Malhas	Flash Top Hat	Individual Jumping	4	0	10	0	0	1	4	0	38.05	Bronze medal

== Swimming ==
Athletes	Event	Heat		Semifinal		Final	
Athletes	Event	Time	Position	Time	Position	Time	Position
Hazem Tashkandi	Boys’ 100m Freestyle	54.23	39	Did not advance			
Hazem Tashkandi	Boys’ 200m Freestyle	1:58.56	35			Did not advance	

== Weightlifting ==
Athlete	Event	Snatch	Clean & Jerk	Total	Rank
Mohsen Al Duhaylib	Boys' 62kg	98	121	219	10
