= Uruguay at the 2010 Summer Youth Olympics =

- IOC code: URU
- NOC: Comité Olímpico Uruguayo

in Singapore
- Competitors: 4 in 3 sports
- Flag bearer: Marcelo Chirico
- Medals Ranked 50th: Gold 1 Silver 0 Bronze 0 Total 1

Summer Youth Olympics appearances
- 2010; 2014; 2018; 2026

Uruguay participated in the 2010 Summer Youth Olympics in Singapore.

== Medalists ==
| Medal | Name | Sport | Event | Date |
|---|---|---|---|---|
| Gold | Marcelo Chirico | Equestrian | Jumping Individual | 24 Aug |

== Equestrian ==
| Athlete | Horse | Event | Round 1 | | | Round 2 | | | Total | Jump-Off | | Rank |
| Athlete | Horse | Event | Penalties | | Rank | Penalties | | Rank | Total | Penalties | Time | Rank |
| Athlete | Horse | Event | Jump | Time | Rank | Jump | Time | Rank | Total | Penalties | Time | Rank |
|---|---|---|---|---|---|---|---|---|---|---|---|---|
| Marcelo Chirico | Links Hot Gossip | Individual Jumping | 0 | 0 | 1 | 0 | 0 | 1 | 0 | 0 | 42.35 | Gold medal |
| Guilherme Foroni (BRA); Maria Victoria Paz (ARG); Alberto Schwalm (CHI); Mario Gamboa (COL); Marcelo Chirico (URU) | The Hec Man; Glen Haven Accolade; Stoneleigh Eddie; LH Titan; Links Hot Gossip | Team Jumping | ~~16~~; ~~12~~; 8; 4; 0 | ~~0~~; ~~0~~; 0; 0; 0 | 4 | 0; ~~16~~; ~~16~~; 0; 4 | 0; ~~0~~; ~~0~~; 0; 0 | 2 | 16 | | | 5 |

== Swimming ==
| Athletes | Event | Heat | | Semifinal | | Final | |
| Athletes | Event | Time | Position | Time | Position | Time | Position |
|---|---|---|---|---|---|---|---|
| Joel Romeu | Boys’ 200m Butterfly | 2:06.02 | 14 | | | Did not advance | |
| Raissa Andrea Guerra | Girls’ 100m Freestyle | 59.70 | 33 | Did not advance | | | |

== Taekwondo ==
| Athlete | Event | Preliminary | Quarterfinal | Semifinal | Final | Rank |
|---|---|---|---|---|---|---|
| Yasmin Terra | Girls' -49kg | Dana Touran (JOR); L 1-14 | Did not advance | | | 9 |
