= Zimbabwe at the 2010 Summer Youth Olympics =

- IOC code: ZIM
- NOC: Zimbabwe Olympic Committee
- Website: www.zoc.co.zw

in Singapore
- Competitors: 27 in 5 sports
- Flag bearer: Tinashe Samuel Mutanga
- Medals: Gold 0 Silver 0 Bronze 0 Total 0

Summer Youth Olympics appearances
- 2010; 2014; 2018

Zimbabwe participated in the 2010 Summer Youth Olympics in Singapore.

It was represented by 27 athletes competing in 5 sports: athletics, cycling, equestrian, football and triathlon.

== Medalists ==
Medal	Name	Sport	Event	Date
Bronze	Yara Hanssen	Equestrian	Team Jumping	20 Aug

== Athletics ==
=== Boys ===
Track and Road Events

Athletes	Event	Qualification		Final	
Athletes	Event	Result	Rank	Result	Rank
Tinashe Samuel Mutanga	Boys' 100m	10.92	6 Q	10.72	6
Tinashe Samuel Mutanga (ZIM); Okeudo Jonathan Nmaju (NGR); Alphas Kishoyian (KEN); Ruan Greyling (RSA)	Boys' Medley Relay			1:53.45	4

=== Girls ===
Track and Road Events

Athletes	Event	Qualification		Final	
Athletes	Event	Result	Rank	Result	Rank
Sithulisiwe Zhou	Girls' 3000m	9:45.76	6 Q	9:53.88	7

== Cycling ==
Cross Country

Athlete	Event	Time	Rank	Points
Nyasha Lungu	Boys' Cross Country	-2LAP	24	72
Shaylene Brown	Girls' Cross Country	-2LAP	24	40

Time Trial

Athlete	Event	Time	Rank	Points
Tyron Mackie	Boys' Time Trial	4:57.99	31	30
Shaylene Brown	Girls' Time Trial	4:02.44	30	40

BMX

Athlete	Event	Seeding Round		Quarterfinals							Semifinals							Final		
Athlete	Event	Seeding Round		Run 1		Run 2		Run 3		Rank	Run 1		Run 2		Run 3		Rank	Final		
Athlete	Event	Time	Rank	Time	Rank	Time	Rank	Time	Rank	Rank	Time	Rank	Time	Rank	Time	Rank	Rank	Time	Rank	Points
Jonathan Lawrence Thackray	Boys' BMX	35.622	21	DNF	8	42.651	6	39.994	6	6	did not advance									72
Shaylene Brown	Girls' BMX	47.169	18	45.670	5	46.115	5	45.376	5	5	did not advance									40

Road Race

Athlete	Event	Time	Rank	Points
Nyasha Lungu	Boys' Road Race	1:05:44	46	72
Tyron Mackie	Boys' Road Race	1:18:01	75	
Jonathan Lawrence Thackray	Boys' Road Race	DNF		

Overall

Team	Event	Cross Country Pts		Time Trial Pts		BMX Pts		Road Race Pts	Total	Rank
Team	Event	Boys	Girls	Boys	Girls	Boys	Girls	Road Race Pts	Total	Rank
Shaylene Brown; Nyasha Lungu; Tyron Mackie; Janathan Lawrence Thackray	Mixed Team	72	40	30	40	72	40	72	366	31

== Equestrian ==
Athlete	Horse	Event	Round 1			Round 2			Total	Jump-Off		Rank
Athlete	Horse	Event	Penalties		Rank	Penalties		Rank	Total	Penalties	Time	Rank
Athlete	Horse	Event	Jump	Time	Rank	Jump	Time	Rank	Total	Penalties	Time	Rank
Yara Hanssen	AP Akermanis	Individual Jumping	24	1	28	24	0	28	49			28
Yara Hanssen (ZIM); Zakaria Hamici (ALG); Abduladim Mlitan (LBA); Mohamed Abdalla (EGY); Samantha McIntosh (RSA)	AP Akermanis; APH Mr Sheen; Belcam Hinnerk; Buzzword; Little Miss Sunshine	Team Jumping	~~12~~; ~~12~~; 4; 0; 0	~~0~~; ~~0~~; 0; 0; 0	1	~~16~~; ~~8~~; 0; 4; 0	~~0~~; ~~1~~; 0; 0; 0	2	8	~~9~~; 8; 8; 8; ~~DNS~~	~~1:03.57~~; 47.48; 55.59; 54.39; ~~DNS~~	Bronze medal

== Football ==
=== Men ===
Squad List	Event	Group Stage		5th Place Match	Rank
Squad List	Event	Group D	Rank	5th Place Match	Rank
Fungai Benard; Keith Murera; Tapiwa Chikaka; Stanford Chavingira; Albert Kusemwa; Prince Gambe; Devyn Hencil; Ben Chikanda; Mncedisi Gumede; Edward Mwanza; Albert Matova; Ackim Mpofu (C); Fortune Sibanda; Lucky Ndlela; Pritchard Sibanda; Davison Chipfupi; Liberty Ngorima; Stanley Dube	Boys' Football	Singapore; L 1–3	3	Vanuatu; L 0–2	6
Fungai Benard; Keith Murera; Tapiwa Chikaka; Stanford Chavingira; Albert Kusemwa; Prince Gambe; Devyn Hencil; Ben Chikanda; Mncedisi Gumede; Edward Mwanza; Albert Matova; Ackim Mpofu (C); Fortune Sibanda; Lucky Ndlela; Pritchard Sibanda; Davison Chipfupi; Liberty Ngorima; Stanley Dube	Boys' Football	Montenegro; L 1–2	3	Vanuatu; L 0–2	6

Group D

Team	Pld	W	D	L	GF	GA	GD	Pts
Singapore	1	1	0	0	3	1	+2	3
Montenegro	1	1	0	0	2	1	+1	3
Zimbabwe	2	0	0	2	2	5	−3	0

Qualified for semifinals

Results

13 August 2010
20:45

Singapore	3–1	Zimbabwe
Mazlan 1'; Suhaimi 11', 30'	Report	Kusemwa 64' (pen.)

Jalan Besar Stadium, Singapore
Attendance: 4,800
Referee: Walter Lopez (Guatemala)

16 August 2010
20:45

Zimbabwe	1–2	Montenegro
Chavanigra 81'	report	Grbovic 28'; Boljevic 44'

Jalan Besar Stadium, Singapore
Attendance: 1,215
Referee: Banjar Al-Dosari (Qatar)

5th place contest

23 August 2010
20:45

Vanuatu	2–0	Zimbabwe
Kalselik 20', 60'	Report

Jalan Besar Stadium, Singapore
Attendance: 1,615
Referee: Walter López (Guatemala)

== Triathlon ==
Men's

Athlete	Event	Swim (1.5 km)	Trans 1	Bike (40 km)	Trans 2	Run (10 km)	Total	Rank
Boyd Littleford	Individual	10:49	0:29	31:43	0:23	20:29	1:03:53.25	30

Girls

Triathlete	Event	Swimming	Transit 1	Cycling	Transit 2	Running	Total time	Rank
Andrea Brown	Individual	10:41	0:37	34:45	0:24	23:32	1:09:59.30	27

Mixed

Athlete	Event	Total Times per Athlete (Swim 250 m, Bike 7 km, Run 1.7 km)	Total Group Time	Rank
Wan Qi Clara Wong (SIN); Livio Molinari (ITA); Cristina Luizzet Betancourt de Leon (PUR); Boyd Littleford (ZIM)	Mixed Team Relay; World Team 2	22:55; 19:36; 23:40; 21:23	1:27:34.96	12
Sara Vilic (CRO); Abrahm Louw (NAM); Andrea Brown (ZIM); Wian Sullwald (RSA)	Mixed Team Relay; World Team 1	21:23; 19:07; 23:11; 19:56	1:23:37.79	9
