= Switzerland at the 2010 Summer Youth Olympics =

- IOC code: SUI
- NOC: Swiss Olympic Association
- Website: www.swissolympic.ch

in Singapore
- Competitors: 22 in 10 sports
- Flag bearer: Oliver Hegi
- Medals Ranked 69th: Gold 0 Silver 1 Bronze 2 Total 3

Summer Youth Olympics appearances
- 2010; 2014; 2018; 2026

Switzerland participated in the 2010 Summer Youth Olympics in Singapore.

== Medalists ==
Medal	Name	Sport	Event	Date
Gold	Martin Fuchs	Equestrian	Team Jumping	20 Aug
Silver	Andrina Schlaepfer	Athletics	Girls' 1000m	23 Aug
Bronze	Noemi Zbaeren	Athletics	Girls' 100m Hurdles	21 Aug
Bronze	Jasmin Mischler	Shooting	10m Air Rifle Women Junior	25 Aug

== Archery ==
Boys

Athlete	Event	Ranking Round		Round of 32	Round of 16	Quarterfinals	Semifinals	Final	
Athlete	Event	Score	Seed	Opposition Score	Opposition Score	Opposition Score	Opposition Score	Opposition Score	Rank
Axel Muller	Boys’ Individual	616	15	Komonyuk (UKR); W 6-2	Park (KOR); L 0-6	Did not advance			9

Mixed Team

Athlete	Event	Partner	Round of 32	Round of 16	Quarterfinals	Semifinals	Final	
Athlete	Event	Partner	Opposition Score	Opposition Score	Opposition Score	Opposition Score	Opposition Score	Rank
Axel Muller	Mixed Team	Laurie Lecointre (FRA)	Sorsa (FIN)/ Tsybzhitov (RUS); L 4-6	Did not advance				17

== Athletics ==
=== Girls ===
Track and Road Events

Athletes	Event	Qualification		Final	
Athletes	Event	Result	Rank	Result	Rank
Andrina Schlaepfer	Girls’ 1000m	2:46.09	3 Q	2:43.84	Silver medal
Noemi Zbaeren	Girls’ 100m Hurdles	13.78	5 Q	13.50	Bronze medal

Field Events

Athletes	Event	Qualification		Final	
Athletes	Event	Result	Rank	Result	Rank
Nathalie Meier	Girls’ Javelin Throw	49.43	4 Q	48.61	7

== Cycling ==
Cross Country

Athlete	Event	Time	Rank	Points
Michael Stuenzi	Boys’ Cross Country	1:03:12	12	61
Linda Indergand	Girls’ Cross Country	47:06	2	5

Time Trial

Athlete	Event	Time	Rank	Points
Marc Schaerli	Boys’ Time Trial	4:19.00	19	30
Linda Indergand	Girls’ Time Trial	3:18.00	1	1

BMX

Athlete	Event	Seeding Round		Quarterfinals							Semifinals							Final		
Athlete	Event	Seeding Round		Run 1		Run 2		Run 3		Rank	Run 1		Run 2		Run 3		Rank	Final		
Athlete	Event	Time	Rank	Time	Rank	Time	Rank	Time	Rank	Rank	Time	Rank	Time	Rank	Time	Rank	Rank	Time	Rank	Points
Romain Tanniger	Boys’ BMX	32.582	9	32.971	4	33.456	4	32.383	2	3 Q	32.552	2	1:16.465	8	33.047	4	4 Q	33.786	8	45
Linda Indergand	Girls’ BMX	42.196	8	41.419	3	41.222	2	41.141	2	2 Q	40.193	4	39.878	4	40.242	4	4 Q	39.644	8	24

Road Race

Athlete	Event	Time	Rank	Points
Michael Stuenzi	Boys’ Road Race	1:05:44	7	40
Marc Schaerli	Boys’ Road Race	1:05:44	22	
Romain Tanniger	Boys’ Road Race	DNF		

Overall

Team	Event	Cross Country Pts		Time Trial Pts		BMX Pts		Road Race Pts	Total	Rank
Team	Event	Boys	Girls	Boys	Girls	Boys	Girls	Road Race Pts	Total	Rank
Linda Indergand; Michael Stuenzi; Marc Schaerli; Romain Tanniger	Mixed Team	61	5	30	1	45	24	40	206	5

== Equestrian ==
Athlete	Horse	Event	Round 1			Round 2			Total	Jump-Off		Rank
Athlete	Horse	Event	Penalties		Rank	Penalties		Rank	Total	Penalties	Time	Rank
Athlete	Horse	Event	Jump	Time	Rank	Jump	Time	Rank	Total	Penalties	Time	Rank
Martin Fuchs	Midnight Mist	Individual Jumping	8	0	16	0	0	1	8			9
Martin Fuchs (SUI); Wojciech Dahlke (POL); Valentina Isoardi (ITA); Carian Scudamore (GBR); Nicola Philippaerts (BEL)	Midnight Mist; Travelling Soldior; Alloria Thomas; Mighty Mcgyver; Gippsland Girl	Team Jumping	0; ~~12~~; ~~28~~; 0; 4	0; ~~0~~; ~~0~~; 0; 0	1	0; 4; ~~16~~; 0; ~~4~~	0; 0; ~~0~~; 0; ~~0~~	2	8	0; 0; ~~24~~; 4; ~~DNS~~	45.30; 49.19; ~~54.92~~; 46.54; ~~DNS~~	Gold medal

== Fencing ==
Group Stage

Athlete	Event	Match 1	Match 2	Match 3	Match 4	Match 5	Match 6	Seed
Pauline Brunner	Girls’ Épée	Rahardja (SIN); W 4-3	Jaqman (PLE); W 5-3	Holmes (USA); L 1-5	Lin (CHN); L 1-5	Santuccio (ITA); L 1-5	Swatowska (POL); L 3-5	9

Knock-Out Stage

Athlete	Event	Round of 16	Quarterfinals	Semifinals	Final	Rank
Pauline Brunner	Girls’ Épée	Radford (GBR); L 13-15	Did not advance			9

== Gymnastics ==
=== Artistic Gymnastics ===
Boys

Athlete	Event	Floor		Pommel Horse		Rings		Vault		Parallel Bars		Horizontal Bar		Total	
Athlete	Event	Score	Rank	Score	Rank	Score	Rank	Score	Rank	Score	Rank	Score	Rank	Score	Rank
Oliver Hegi	Boys' Qualification	12.300	38	13.400	16	13.650	16	15.350	16	12.550	27	13.750	12	81.000	19

Girls

Athlete	Event	Vault		Uneven Bars		Beam		Floor		Total	
Athlete	Event	Score	Rank	Score	Rank	Score	Rank	Score	Rank	Score	Rank
Nadia Baeriswyl	Girls' Qualification	12.900	29	12.300	17	12.600	23	12.450	20	50.250	20

=== Trampoline ===
Athlete	Event	Qualification				Final	
Athlete	Event	Routine 1	Routine 2	Total	Rank	Routine 1	Rank
Simone Scherer	Girls' Trampoline	25.700	32.300	58.000	8 Q	31.200	7

== Rowing ==
Athlete	Event	Heats		Repechage		Semifinals		Final		Overall Rank
Athlete	Event	Time	Rank	Time	Rank	Time	Rank	Time	Rank	Overall Rank
Augustin Maillefer	Boys' Single Sculls	3:32.84	4 QR	3:35.35	2 QA/B	3:39.76	6 QB	3:30.61	3	9

== Sailing ==
One Person Dinghy

Athlete	Event	Race												Points	Rank
Athlete	Event	1	2	3	4	5	6	7	8	9	10	11	M*	Points	Rank
Sebastien Schneiter	Boys' Byte CII	22	21	11	10	~~25~~	19	16	~~DSQ~~	7	10	21	20	157	22
Alexandra Rayroux	Girls' Byte CII	3	3	17	9	8	6	9	16	~~21~~	~~OCS~~	19	18	108	13

== Shooting ==
Pistol

Athlete	Event	Qualification		Final		
Athlete	Event	Score	Rank	Score	Total	Rank
Eliane Dohner	Girls' 10m Air Pistol	373	7 Q	86.3	459.3	8

Rifle

Athlete	Event	Qualification		Final		
Athlete	Event	Score	Rank	Score	Total	Rank
Jan Lockbihler	Boys' 10m Air Rifle	582	14	Did not advance		
Jasmin Mischler	Girls' 10m Air Rifle	395	4 Q	103.1	498.1	Bronze medal

== Swimming ==
Athletes	Event	Heat		Semifinal		Final	
Athletes	Event	Time	Position	Time	Position	Time	Position
Yannick Kaeser	Boys’ 100m Breaststroke	1:05.19	15 Q	1:04.64	10	Did not advance	
Yannick Kaeser	Boys’ 200m Breaststroke	2:19.78	9 Q*			2:17.78	6
Danielle Villars	Girls’ 100m Freestyle	57.59	7 Q	57.22	7 Q	57.72	8
Danielle Villars	Girls’ 200m Freestyle	2:03.56	5 Q			2:04.89	8
Danielle Villars	Girls’ 200m Backstroke	2:19.31	17			Did not advance	
Danielle Villars	Girls’ 50m Butterfly	28.64	14 Q	28.59	14	Did not advance	
Danielle Villars	Girls’ 100m Butterfly	1:02.80	18	Did not advance			
Annick van Westerndorp	Girls’ 200m Freestyle	2:04.59	12			Did not advance	
Annick van Westerndorp	Girls’ 400m Freestyle	4:20.17	9			Did not advance	
Annick van Westerndorp	Girls’ 200m Butterfly	2:20.91	18			Did not advance	

- * Qualified due to withdrawal of another swimmer
