= Libya at the 2010 Summer Youth Olympics =

- IOC code: LBA
- NOC: Libyan Olympic Committee

in Singapore
- Competitors: 7 in 7 sports
- Flag bearer: Sofyan El Gadi
- Medals: Gold 0 Silver 0 Bronze 0 Total 0

Summer Youth Olympics appearances
- 2010; 2014; 2018

Libya competed at the 2010 Summer Youth Olympics, the inaugural Youth Olympic Games, held in Singapore from 14 August to 26 August 2010.

== Medalists ==
Medal	Name	Sport	Event	Date
Bronze	Abduladim Mlitan	Equestrian	Team Jumping	20 Aug

== Athletics ==
=== Girls ===
Track and Road Events

Athletes	Event	Qualification		Final	
Athletes	Event	Result	Rank	Result	Rank
Entisar Shushan	Girls’ 1000m	3:21.24	27 qB	3:13.21	27

== Equestrian ==
Athlete	Horse	Event	Round 1			Round 2			Total	Jump-Off		Rank
Athlete	Horse	Event	Penalties		Rank	Penalties		Rank	Total	Penalties	Time	Rank
Athlete	Horse	Event	Jump	Time	Rank	Jump	Time	Rank	Total	Penalties	Time	Rank
Abduladim Mlitan	Belcam Hinnerk	Individual Jumping	8	0	16	0	0	1	8			9
Yara Hanssen (ZIM); Zakaria Hamici (ALG); Abduladim Mlitan (LBA); Mohamed Abdalla (EGY); Samantha McIntosh (RSA)	AP Akermanis; APH Mr Sheen; Belcam Hinnerk; Buzzword; Little Miss Sunshine	Team Jumping	~~12~~; ~~12~~; 4; 0; 0	~~0~~; ~~0~~; 0; 0; 0	1	~~16~~; ~~8~~; 0; 4; 0	~~0~~; ~~1~~; 0; 0; 0	2	8	~~9~~; 8; 8; 8; ~~DNS~~	~~1:03.57~~; 47.48; 55.59; 54.39; ~~DNS~~	Bronze medal

== Judo ==
Individual

Athlete	Event	Round 1	Round 2	Round 3	Semifinals	Final	Rank
Athlete	Event	Opposition Result	Opposition Result	Opposition Result	Opposition Result	Opposition Result	Rank
Anis Shalabi	Boys' -81 kg	Toth (HUN); L 000-002	Repechage; Omerovic (BIH); L 000-001	Did not advance			13

Team

Team	Event	Round 1	Round 2	Semifinals	Final	Rank
Team	Event	Opposition Result	Opposition Result	Opposition Result	Opposition Result	Rank
Hamilton; Cynthia Rahming (BAH); Paolo Persoglia (SMR); Odette Giuffrida (ITA); Davit Ghazaryan (ARM); Wildjie Vertus (HAI); Jae Hyung Lee (KOR); Una Svetlana Tuba (SRB); Anis Shalabi (LBA)	Mixed Team	BYE	Cairo; L 4-4 (2-3)	Did not advance		5

== Shooting ==
Rifle

Athlete	Event	Qualification		Final		
Athlete	Event	Score	Rank	Score	Total	Rank
Majduleen Mulud	Girls' 10m Air Rifle	358	20	Did not advance		

== Swimming ==
Athletes	Event	Heat		Semifinal		Final	
Athletes	Event	Time	Position	Time	Position	Time	Position
Sofyan El Gadi	Boys’ 100m Butterfly	59.07	29	Did not advance			
Sofyan El Gadi	Boys’ 200m Butterfly	2:21.66	21			Did not advance	

== Taekwondo ==
Athlete	Event	Preliminary	Quarterfinal	Semifinal	Final	Rank
Taha Madnini	Boys' -63kg	Alejandro Valdés (MEX); L 7-8	Did not advance			9

== Weightlifting ==
Athlete	Event	Snatch	Clean & jerk	Total	Rank
Maraj Tubal	Boys' 69kg	110	130	240	8
