= Oman at the 2010 Summer Youth Olympics =

- IOC code: OMA
- NOC: Oman Olympic Committee

in Singapore
- Competitors: 2 in 2 sports
- Flag bearer: Sultan Al Tooqi
- Medals: Gold 0 Silver 0 Bronze 0 Total 0

Summer Youth Olympics appearances
- 2010; 2014; 2018

The Oman participated in the 2010 Summer Youth Olympics in Singapore.

== Medalists ==
Medal	Name	Sport	Event	Date
Silver	Sultan Al Tooqi	Equestrian	Team Jumping	20 Aug

== Athletics ==
Note: The athletes who do not have a "Q" next to their Qualification Rank advance to a non-medal ranking final.

=== Girls ===
Track and Road Events

Athletes	Event	Qualification		Final	
Athletes	Event	Result	Rank	Result	Rank
Shinoona Al Habsi	Girls' 100m	14.29	33 qE	DNS	

== Equestrian ==
Athlete	Horse	Event	Round 1			Round 2			Total	Jump-Off		Rank
Athlete	Horse	Event	Penalties		Rank	Penalties		Rank	Total	Penalties	Time	Rank
Athlete	Horse	Event	Jump	Time	Rank	Jump	Time	Rank	Total	Penalties	Time	Rank
Sultan Al Tooqi	Joondooree Farms Damiro	Individual Jumping	12	0	23	16	0	27	28			27
Jasmine Zin Man Lai (HKG); Jake Lambert (NZL); Xu Zhengyang (CHN); Sultan Al Tooqi (OMA); Thomas McDermott (AUS)	Butterfly Kisses; Le Lucky; Foxdale Villarni; Joondooree Farms Damiro; Hugo	Team Jumping	~~12~~; 0; ~~16~~; 4; 0	~~0~~; 0; ~~0~~; 0; 0	1	4; 0; ~~20~~; ~~4~~; 0	0; 0; ~~0~~; ~~0~~; 0	2	8	0; ~~12~~; 0; 4; ~~8~~	50.57; ~~46.14~~; 51.46; 52.23; ~~46.10~~	Silver medal
