= Judo at the 2010 Summer Youth Olympics – Girls' 78 kg =

Judo competition

The Girls' 78 kg tournament in Judo at the 2010 Summer Youth Olympics was held on August 23 at the International Convention Centre.

This event was the heaviest of the girl's judo weight classes, limiting competitors to a maximum of 78 kilograms of body mass. The tournament bracket consisted of a single-elimination contest culminating in a gold medal match. There was also a repechage to determine the winners of the two bronze medals. Each judoka who had lost before the finals competed in the repechage with the two finalists getting bronze medals.

== Medalists ==
Gold	Lola Mansour; Belgium
Silver	Natalia Kubin; Germany
Bronze	Kseniya Darchuk; Ukraine
Bronze	Urska Potocnik; Slovenia

== Results ==
=== Main Bracket ===
Round of 16
Una Svetlana Tuba (SRB)	000
Lola Mansour (BEL)	001

Quarterfinals
Milica Savic (BIH)	000
Lola Mansour (BEL)	101
Sana Khelifi (ALG)	000
Urska Potocnik (SLO)	001
Natalia Kubin (GER)	100
Kadijah Maxwell (BAR)	000
Kseniya Darchuk (UKR)	010
Melva Marina Tobar Calderon (GUA)	000

Semifinals
Lola Mansour (BEL)	002
Urska Potocnik (SLO)	000
Natalia Kubin (GER)	101
Kseniya Darchuk (UKR)	000

Finals
Lola Mansour (BEL)	001
Natalia Kubin (GER)	000

=== Repechage ===
First round
Una Svetlana Tuba (SRB)	BYE

Second round
Una Svetlana Tuba (SRB)	100
Sana Khelifi (ALG)	000
Milica Savic (BIH)	BYE
Melva Marina Tobar Calderon (GUA)	BYE
Kadijah Maxwell (BAR)	BYE

Third round
Una Svetlana Tuba (SRB)	100
Milica Savic (BIH)	000
Melva Marina Tobar Calderon (GUA)	101
Kadijah Maxwell (BAR)	000

Bronze Medal Finals
Una Svetlana Tuba (SRB)	001
Kseniya Darchuk (UKR)	100
Melva Marina Tobar Calderon (GUA)	001
Urska Potocnik (SLO)	010
