= Swimming at the 2010 Summer Youth Olympics – Boys' 100 metre freestyle =

The boys' 100 metre freestyle event at the 2010 Youth Olympic Games took place on August 19–20, at the Singapore Sports School.

== Medalists ==
Gold	Mehdy Metella; France	49.99
Silver	Velimir Stjepanović; Serbia	50.25
Bronze	Kenneth To; Australia	50.29

== Heats ==
=== Heat 1 ===
Rank	Lane	Name	Nationality	Time	Notes
1	2	Cristian Quintero	Venezuela	50.82	Q
2	4	Ulziibadrakh Gantulga	Mongolia	59.35	
3	3	François Mallack	Senegal	1:01.21	
4	5	Cristofer Jimenez	Nicaragua	1:02.32	
5	8	Richard Francis Regis	Grenada	1:02.69	
6	7	Tsilavina Ramanantsoa	Madagascar	1:02.80	
7	1	Soule Soilihi	Comoros	1:18.38	
	6	Abdourahman Osman	Djibouti		DNS

=== Heat 2 ===
Rank	Lane	Name	Nationality	Time	Notes
1	6	Jonathan Ponson	Aruba	54.14	
2	5	Julien Brice	Saint Lucia	55.01	
3	3	Brian Forte	Jamaica	55.62	
4	4	Ahmed Salam Al-Dulaimi	Iraq	56.09	
5	2	Sergey Pevinev	Armenia	56.97	
6	7	Abdul Allolan	Qatar	57.14	
7	1	David Buruchara	Comoros	58.17	
8	8	Ghulam Muhammad	Pakistan	1:02.68	

=== Heat 3 ===
Rank	Lane	Name	Nationality	Time	Notes
1	4	Bertug Coskun	Turkey	52.48	
2	2	Oussama Sahnoune	Algeria	52.54	
3	7	Pierre Keune	South Africa	52.94	
4	3	Kevin Salvador Avila Soto	Guatemala	53.12	
5	5	Quy Phuoc Hoang	Vietnam	53.36	
6	6	Gustavo Manuel Silva Santa	Portugal	53.76	
7	1	Hazem Tashkandi	Saudi Arabia	54.23	
8	8	Quinton Delie	Namibia	54.40	

=== Heat 4 ===
Rank	Lane	Name	Nationality	Time	Notes
1	3	Ivan Levaj	Croatia	51.23	Q
2	6	Clement Lim	Singapore	51.40	Q
3	2	Jessie Lacuna	Philippines	52.10	
4	8	Dion Dreesens	Netherlands	52.38	
5	5	Jeremy Bagshaw	Canada	52.54	
6	7	Arren Quek	Singapore	52.69	
7	4	Matthew Stanley	New Zealand	52.80	
8	1	Juan Manuel Arbelaez	Colombia	53.08	

=== Heat 5 ===
Rank	Lane	Name	Nationality	Time	Notes
1	6	Kevin Leithold	Germany	51.01	Q
2	3	Péter Bernek	Hungary	51.40	Q
3	2	Raphaël Stacchiotti	Luxembourg	51.74	Q
4	7	Aaron Angel Souza	India	51.76	Q
5	5	Aitor Martínez	Spain	51.84	Q
6	1	Roberto Strelkov	Argentina	52.15	
7	8	Sebastian Arispe	Peru	52.27	
8	4	Tommaso Romani	Italy		DNS

=== Heat 6 ===
Rank	Lane	Name	Nationality	Time	Notes
1	6	Kenneth To	Australia	50.67	Q
2	2	Marius Radu	Romania	51.61	Q
3	8	Pjotr Degtjarjov	Estonia	51.85	Q
4	7	Victor Rodrigues	Brazil	51.92	Q
5	5	Ching Tat Lum	Hong Kong	52.33	
6	3	Alessio Torlai	Italy	52.71	
7	1	Mans Hjelm	Sweden	53.31	
8	4	Andrii Govorov	Ukraine	56.15	

=== Heat 7 ===
Rank	Lane	Name	Nationality	Time	Notes
1	3	Velimir Stjepanović	Serbia	51.16	Q
2	6	Mehdy Metella	France	51.25	Q
3	2	Justin James	Australia	51.62	Q
4	4	He Jianbin	China	51.83	Q
5	7	Andrey Ushakov	Russia	51.92	Q
6	8	Yeray Lebon	Spain	52.00	
7	1	Thomas Stephens	United States	52.20	
8	5	Abdullah Altuwaini	Kuwait	52.74	

== Semifinals ==
=== Semifinal 1 ===
Rank	Lane	Name	Nationality	Time	Notes
1	3	Mehdy Metella	France	50.21	Q
2	4	Cristian Quintero	Venezuela	50.55	Q
3	5	Velimir Stjepanović	Serbia	50.56	Q
4	6	Marius Radu	Romania	50.88	Q
5	7	He Jianbin	China	50.89	Q
6	8	Andrey Ushakov	Russia	51.49	
7	2	Raphaël Stacchiotti	Luxembourg	51.67	
8	1	Pjotr Degtjarjov	Estonia	52.67	

=== Semifinal 2 ===
Rank	Lane	Name	Nationality	Time	Notes
1	4	Kenneth To	Australia	49.96	Q
2	5	Kevin Leithold	Germany	50.65	Q
3	2	Justin James	Australia	51.44	Q
4	1	Aitor Martínez	Spain	51.46	
5	7	Aaron Angel Souza	India	51.49	
6	3	Ivan Levaj	Croatia	51.75	
7	6	Yong En Clement Yong	Singapore	51.75	
8	8	Victor Rodrigues	Brazil	52.07	

== Final ==
Rank	Lane	Name	Nationality	Time	Notes
1st place, gold medalist(s)	5	Mehdy Metella	France	49.99	
2nd place, silver medalist(s)	6	Velimir Stjepanović	Serbia	50.25	
3rd place, bronze medalist(s)	4	Kenneth To	Australia	50.29	
4	3	Cristian Quintero	Venezuela	50.47	
5	1	He Jianbin	China	50.69	
6	7	Marius Radu	Romania	50.76	
7	2	Kevin Leithold	Germany	50.93	
8	8	Justin James	Australia	51.21	
