= United Arab Emirates at the 2010 Summer Youth Olympics =

- IOC code: UAE
- NOC: United Arab Emirates National Olympic Committee

in Singapore
- Competitors: 4 in 4 sports
- Flag bearer: Sheikh Ali Abdulla Majid Alqassimi
- Medals: Gold 0 Silver 0 Bronze 0 Total 0

Summer Youth Olympics appearances
- 2010; 2014; 2018; 2026

The United Arab Emirates competed at the 2010 Summer Youth Olympics, the inaugural Youth Olympic Games, held in Singapore from 14 August to 26 August 2010.

== Equestrian ==
Athlete	Horse	Event	Round 1			Round 2			Total	Jump-Off		Rank
Athlete	Horse	Event	Penalties		Rank	Penalties		Rank	Total	Penalties	Time	Rank
Athlete	Horse	Event	Jump	Time	Rank	Jump	Time	Rank	Total	Penalties	Time	Rank
Shiekh Alqassimi	Pearl Monarch	Individual Jumping	4	0	10	4	0	8	8			9
Mohamad Alanzarouti (SYR); Timur Patarov (KAZ); Abdurahman Marri (QAT); Pei Chew (SIN); Sheikh Alqassimi (UAE)	Van Diemen; Chatham Park Rosie; Emmaville Persuasion; Gatineau; Pearl Monarch	Team Jumping	~~8~~; ~~EL~~; 4; 4; 4	~~0~~; ~~EL~~; 0; 0; 0	4	~~4~~; 0; ~~8~~; 0; 0	~~0~~; 0; ~~0~~; 0; 0	1	12			4

== Sailing ==
One Person Dinghy

Athlete	Event	Race												Points	Rank
Athlete	Event	1	2	3	4	5	6	7	8	9	10	11	M*	Points	Rank
Saif Ibrahim Al Hammadi	Boys' Byte CII	25	~~27~~	~~28~~	24	24	25	23	20	22	21	20	27	231	27

== Shooting ==
Rifle

Athlete	Event	Qualification		Final		
Athlete	Event	Score	Rank	Score	Total	Rank
Salem Alqaydi	Boys' 10m Air Rifle	558	20	Did not advance		

== Taekwondo ==
Athlete	Event	Preliminary	Quarterfinal	Semifinal	Final	Rank
Haya Jumaa	Girls' -49kg	BYE	Worawong Pongpanit (THA); L 2-12	Did not advance		5
