= Guatemala at the 2010 Summer Youth Olympics =

- IOC code: GUA
- NOC: Comité Olímpico Guatemalteco

in Singapore
- Competitors: 12 in 8 sports
- Flag bearer: Elvin Aroldo Lopez Calderon
- Medals Ranked 84th: Gold 0 Silver 0 Bronze 1 Total 1

Summer Youth Olympics appearances
- 2010; 2014; 2018; 2026

Guatemala participated in the 2010 Summer Youth Olympics in Singapore.

The Guatemalan squad consisted of 12 athletes competing in 8 sports: aquatics (swimming), equestrian, gymnastics, judo, modern pentathlon, sailing, shooting and weightlifting.

== Medalists ==
Medal	Name	Sport	Event	Date
Bronze	Geraldine Kate Solórzano	Shooting	10m Air Pistol Women Junior	23 Aug

== Equestrian ==
Athlete	Horse	Event	Round 1			Round 2			Total	Jump-Off		Rank
Athlete	Horse	Event	Penalties		Rank	Penalties		Rank	Total	Penalties	Time	Rank
Athlete	Horse	Event	Jump	Time	Rank	Jump	Time	Rank	Total	Penalties	Time	Rank
Juan Diego Saenz Morel	Little Plains	Individual Jumping	4	0	10	4	0	8	8			9
Eirin Bruheim (USA); Kelsey Bayley (BAR); Alejandra Ortiz (PAN); Juan Diego Saenz Morel (GUA); Dominique Shone (CAN)	Lenny Hays; Virtuous Flare; Sobraon Park Fancy Pants; Little Plains; Roxy Girl	Team Jumping	~~16~~; 8; ~~8~~; 4; 4	~~0~~; 0; ~~0~~; 0; 0	6	~~20~~; ~~12~~; 8; 8; 0	~~1~~; ~~1~~; 0; 0; 0	6	32			6

== Gymnastics ==
=== Artistic Gymnastics ===
Girls

Athlete	Event	Vault		Uneven Bars		Beam		Floor		Total	
Athlete	Event	Score	Rank	Score	Rank	Score	Rank	Score	Rank	Score	Rank
Ana Sofía Gómez	Girls' Qualification	13.750	9	12.900	10	14.200	5 Q	13.200	8 Q	54.050	6 Q
Ana Sofía Gómez	Girls' Individual All-Around	13.400	13	13.100	7	14.150	4	13.400	5	54.050	5

Athlete	Event	Score	Rank
Ana Sofía Gómez	Girls' Beam	14.100	4
Ana Sofía Gómez	Girls' Floor	13.700	4

== Judo ==
Individual

Athlete	Event	Round 1	Round 2	Round 3	Semifinals	Final	Rank
Athlete	Event	Opposition Result	Opposition Result	Opposition Result	Opposition Result	Opposition Result	Rank
Melva Marina Tobar Calderon	Girls' -78 kg	BYE	Darchuk (UKR); L 000-010		Repechage; Maxwell (BAR); W 101-000	Bronze Medal Match; Potocnik (SLO); L 000-010	5

== Modern pentathlon ==
Athlete	Event	Fencing (Épée One Touch)			Swimming (200m Freestyle)			Running & Shooting (3000m, Laser Pistol)			Total Points	Final Rank
Athlete	Event	Results	Rank	Points	Time	Rank	Points	Time	Rank	Points	Total Points	Final Rank
Jorge David Imeri Cabrera	Boys' Individual	10-13	17	740	2:15.99	19	1172	12:24.00	19	2024	3936	21
Nuria Chavarria (ESP); Jorge David Imeri Cabrera (GUA)	Mixed Relay	54-38	5	900	2:13.18	23	1204	17:00.81	21	2000	4104	20

== Sailing ==
One Person Dinghy

Athlete	Event	Race												Points	Rank
Athlete	Event	1	2	3	4	5	6	7	8	9	10	11	M*	Points	Rank
Irene Abascal van Blerk	Girls' Byte CII	27	26	~~DSQ~~	26	28	~~30~~	28	30	27	27	20	25	264	28

Windsurfing

Athlete	Event	Race											Points	Rank
Athlete	Event	1	2	3	4	5	6	7	8	9	10	M*	Points	Rank
Juan Lejarraga McSweeney	Boys' Techno 293	18	18	11	18	~~20~~	20	16	14	17	10	15	157	18

== Shooting ==
Pistol

Athlete	Event	Qualification		Final			
Athlete	Event	Score	Rank	Score	Total	Shoot-Off	Rank
Geraldine Kate Solorzano	Girls' 10m Air Pistol	374	4 Q	97.5	471.5	10.1	Bronze medal

Rifle

Athlete	Event	Qualification		Final		
Athlete	Event	Score	Rank	Score	Total	Rank
Elvin Aroldo Lopez	Boys' 10m Air Rifle	600	16	Did not advance		
Polymaria Velasquez	Girls' 10m Air Rifle	380	19	Did not advance		

== Swimming ==
Athletes	Event	Heat		Semifinal		Final	
Athletes	Event	Time	Position	Time	Position	Time	Position
Kevin Salvador Avila Soto	Boys’ 100m Freestyle	53.12	34	Did not advance			
Kevin Salvador Avila Soto	Boys’ 200m Freestyle	1:57.73	31			Did not advance	
Karla Yolanda Rafaela Toscano Lopez	Girls’ 200m Backstroke	2:26.23	29			Did not advance	
Karla Yolanda Rafaela Toscano Lopez	Girls’ 200m Individual Medley	DSQ				Did not advance	

== Weightlifting ==
Athlete	Event	Snatch	Clean & Jerk	Total	Rank
Nelson Anthony Mansilla Felipe	Boys' +85kg	105	118	223	7
