= Panama at the 2010 Summer Youth Olympics =

- IOC code: PAN
- NOC: Comité Olímpico de Panamá

in Singapore
- Competitors: 7 in 3 sports
- Flag bearer: Enrique Grenald
- Medals: Gold 0 Silver 0 Bronze 0 Total 0

Summer Youth Olympics appearances
- 2010; 2014; 2018; 2026

Panama competed at the 2010 Summer Youth Olympics, the inaugural Youth Olympic Games, held in Singapore from 14 August to 26 August 2010.

== Athletics ==
=== Boys ===
Track and Road Events

Athletes	Event	Qualification		Final	
Athletes	Event	Result	Rank	Result	Rank
Mateo Edward	Boys' 100m	10.99	8 Q	10.80	8

Field Events

Athletes	Event	Qualification		Final	
Athletes	Event	Result	Rank	Result	Rank
Juan Mosquera	Boys’ Long Jump	7.04	10 qB	4.37	13

== Basketball ==
Boys

Squad List	Event	Group Stage		Placement Stage			Rank
Squad List	Event	Group B	Rank	17th-20th			Rank
Enrique Grenald (C); Bryan Waithe; Darwin Archibold; Alejandro Grant	Boys' Basketball	Lithuania; L 14-33	5	India; L 12-28	Singapore; L 20-33	South Africa; L 13-21	20
Enrique Grenald (C); Bryan Waithe; Darwin Archibold; Alejandro Grant	Boys' Basketball	Argentina; L 16-27	5	India; L 12-28	Singapore; L 20-33	South Africa; L 13-21	20
Enrique Grenald (C); Bryan Waithe; Darwin Archibold; Alejandro Grant	Boys' Basketball	Iran; L 21-29	5	India; L 12-28	Singapore; L 20-33	South Africa; L 13-21	20
Enrique Grenald (C); Bryan Waithe; Darwin Archibold; Alejandro Grant	Boys' Basketball	Egypt; L 7-30	5	India; L 12-28	Singapore; L 20-33	South Africa; L 13-21	20

== Equestrian ==
Athlete	Horse	Event	Round 1			Round 2			Total	Jump-Off		Rank
Athlete	Horse	Event	Penalties		Rank	Penalties		Rank	Total	Penalties	Time	Rank
Athlete	Horse	Event	Jump	Time	Rank	Jump	Time	Rank	Total	Penalties	Time	Rank
Alejandra Ortiz	Sobraon Park Fancy Pants	Individual Jumping	8	0	16	12	0	24	20			23
Eirin Bruheim (USA); Kelsey Bayley (BAR); Alejandra Ortiz (PAN); Juan Diego Saenz Morel (GUA); Dominique Shone (CAN)	Lenny Hays; Virtuous Flare; Sobraon Park Fancy Pants; Little Plains; Roxy Girl	Team Jumping	~~16~~; 8; ~~8~~; 4; 4	~~0~~; 0; ~~0~~; 0; 0	6	~~20~~; ~~12~~; 8; 8; 0	~~1~~; ~~1~~; 0; 0; 0	6	32			6
