= Barbados at the 2010 Summer Youth Olympics =

- IOC code: BAR
- NOC: Barbados Olympic Association

in Singapore
- Competitors: 9 in 5 sports
- Flag bearer: Kadijah Maxwell
- Medals: Gold 0 Silver 0 Bronze 0 Total 0

Summer Youth Olympics appearances
- 2010; 2014; 2018

Barbados participated in the 2010 Summer Youth Olympics in Singapore.

The Barbados team consisted of 9 athletes competing in 5 sports: Athletics, Equestrian, Judo, Swimming and Tennis

== Athletics ==
=== Boys ===
Track and Road Events

| Athletes | Event | Qualification | | Final | |
| Athletes | Event | Result | Rank | Result | Rank |
|---|---|---|---|---|---|
| Shaquille Alleyne | Boys' 400m | 48.68 | 10 qB | 48.35 | 10 |
| Anthonio Mascoll | Boys' 1000m | 2:25.43 | 8 Q | 2:37.14 | 10 |
| Teamaine Maloney | Boys' 400m Hurdles | 53.86 | 10 qB | 53.20 | 8 |

=== Girls ===
Track and Road Events

| Athletes | Event | Qualification | | Final | |
| Athletes | Event | Result | Rank | Result | Rank |
|---|---|---|---|---|---|
| Shavonne Husbands | Girls’ 200m | 25.08 | 11 qB | 24.58 | 9 |
| Sade-Mariah Greenidge | Girls’ 100m Hurdles | 14.02 | 9 qB | 13.83 | 9 |

== Equestrian ==
| Athlete | Horse | Event | Round 1 | | | Round 2 | | | Total | Jump-Off | | Rank |
| Athlete | Horse | Event | Penalties | | Rank | Penalties | | Rank | Total | Penalties | Time | Rank |
| Athlete | Horse | Event | Jump | Time | Rank | Jump | Time | Rank | Total | Penalties | Time | Rank |
|---|---|---|---|---|---|---|---|---|---|---|---|---|
| Kelsey Bayley | Virtuous Flare | Individual Jumping | 12 | 0 | 23 | 4 | 0 | 8 | 16 | | | 21 |
| Eirin Bruheim (USA); Kelsey Bayley (BAR); Alejandra Ortiz (PAN); Juan Diego Saenz Morel (GUA); Dominique Shone (CAN) | Lenny Hays; Virtuous Flare; Sobraon Park Fancy Pants; Little Plains; Roxy Girl | Team Jumping | ~~16~~; 8; ~~8~~; 4; 4 | ~~0~~; 0; ~~0~~; 0; 0 | 6 | ~~20~~; ~~12~~; 8; 8; 0 | ~~1~~; ~~1~~; 0; 0; 0 | 6 | 32 | | | 6 |

== Judo ==
Individual

| Athlete | Event | Round 1 | Round 2 | Round 3 | Semifinals | Final | Rank |
| Athlete | Event | Opposition Result | Opposition Result | Opposition Result | Opposition Result | Opposition Result | Rank |
|---|---|---|---|---|---|---|---|
| Kadijah Maxwell | Girls' -78 kg | BYE | Kubin (GER); L 000-100 | | Repechage; Calderon (GUA); L 000-101 | Did not advance | 7 |

Team

| Team | Event | Round 1 | Round 2 | Semifinals | Final | Rank |
| Team | Event | Opposition Result | Opposition Result | Opposition Result | Opposition Result | Rank |
|---|---|---|---|---|---|---|
| Birmingham; Fahariya Takidine (COM); Ecaterina Guica (CAN); Song Chol Hyon (PRK); Neo Kapenko (BOT); Chin Jie Lim (SIN); Kadijah Maxwell (BAR); Krisztian Toth (HUN) | Mixed Team | Cairo; L 2-5 | Did not advance | | | 9 |

== Swimming ==
| Athletes | Event | Heat | | Semifinal | | Final | |
| Athletes | Event | Time | Position | Time | Position | Time | Position |
|---|---|---|---|---|---|---|---|
| Lee-Ann Rose | Girls’ 100m Backstroke | 1:08.41 | 32 | Did not advance | | | |
| Lee-Ann Rose | Girls’ 200m Backstroke | 2:25.29 | 27 | | | Did not advance | |

== Tennis ==
Singles

| Athlete | Event | Round 1 | Round 2 | Quarterfinals | Semifinals | Final | Rank |
|---|---|---|---|---|---|---|---|
| Darian King | Boys' Singles | Gómez (COL); L 0-2 (3-6, 2-6) | Consolation; Heller (GER); W 2-1 (4-6, 7-6, 10-7) | Consolation; Patrombon (PHI); W 2-0 (7-6, 6-3) | Consolation; Horanský (SVK); W 2-1 (0-6, 7-6, 10-6) | Consolation; Micov (MKD); W 2-0 (7-5, 6-2) | |

Doubles

| Athlete | Event | Round 1 | Quarterfinals | Semifinals | Final | Rank |
|---|---|---|---|---|---|---|
| Darian King (BAR); Pavel Krainik (CAN) | Boys' Doubles | Baluda (RUS); Biryukov (RUS); L 0-2 (4-6, 3-6) | Did not advance | | | |
