= Qatar at the 2010 Summer Youth Olympics =

- IOC code: QAT
- NOC: Qatar Olympic Committee

in Singapore
- Competitors: 6 in 5 sports
- Flag bearer: Bahya Al-Hamad
- Medals Ranked 74th: Gold 0 Silver 1 Bronze 0 Total 1

Summer Youth Olympics appearances
- 2010; 2014; 2018

Qatar participated in the 2010 Summer Youth Olympics in Singapore.

The Qatar squad consisted of 6 athletes competing in 5 sports: aquatics (swimming), athletics, equestrian, gymnastics and shooting.

== Medalists ==
Medal	Name	Sport	Event	Date
Silver	Hamza Driouch	Athletics	Boys' 1000m	22 Aug

== Athletics ==
=== Boys ===
Track and Road Events

Athletes	Event	Qualification		Final	
Athletes	Event	Result	Rank	Result	Rank
Hamza Driouch	Boys' 1000m	2:24.51	2 Q	2:21.25	Silver medal

== Equestrian ==
Athlete	Horse	Event	Round 1			Round 2			Total	Jump-Off		Rank
Athlete	Horse	Event	Penalties		Rank	Penalties		Rank	Total	Penalties	Time	Rank
Athlete	Horse	Event	Jump	Time	Rank	Jump	Time	Rank	Total	Penalties	Time	Rank
Abdurahman Al Marri	Emmaville Persuasion	Individual Jumping	4	0	10	0	0	1	4	4	38.61	5
Mohamad Alanzarouti (SYR); Timor Patarov (KAZ); Abdurahman Al Marri (QAT); Pei Jia Caroline Chew (SIN); Sheikh Ali Abdulla Majid Alqassimi (UAE)	Van Diemen; Chatham Park Rosie; Emmaville Persuasion; Gatineau; Pearl Monarch	Team Jumping	~~8~~; ~~EL~~; 4; 4; 4	~~0~~; ~~EL~~; 0; 0; 0	4	~~4~~; 0; ~~8~~; 0; 0	~~0~~; 0; ~~0~~; 0; 0	1	12			4

== Gymnastics ==
=== Artistic Gymnastics ===
Boys

Athlete	Event	Floor		Pommel Horse		Rings		Vault		Parallel Bars		Horizontal Bar		Total	
Athlete	Event	Score	Rank	Score	Rank	Score	Rank	Score	Rank	Score	Rank	Score	Rank	Score	Rank
Ahmed Aldayani	Boys' Qualification	11.550	40	12.850	25	11.650	38	15.100	20	12.150	32	12.600	29	75.900	35

Girls

Athlete	Event	Vault		Uneven Bars		Beam		Floor		Total	
Athlete	Event	Score	Rank	Score	Rank	Score	Rank	Score	Rank	Score	Rank
Shaden Wohdan	Girls' Qualification	12.350	36	10.700	33	12.650	22	10.250	40	45.950	33

== Shooting ==
Rifle

Athlete	Event	Qualification		Final		
Athlete	Event	Score	Rank	Score	Total	Rank
Bahya Mansour Al Hamad	Girls' 10m Air Rifle	387	15	Did not advance		

== Swimming ==
Athletes	Event	Heat		Semifinal		Final	
Athletes	Event	Time	Position	Time	Position	Time	Position
Abdul Allolan	Boys’ 50m Freestyle	26.45	35	Did not advance			
Abdul Allolan	Boys’ 100m Freestyle	57.14	46	Did not advance			
