= Dalma Malhas =

Saudi Arabian equestrian

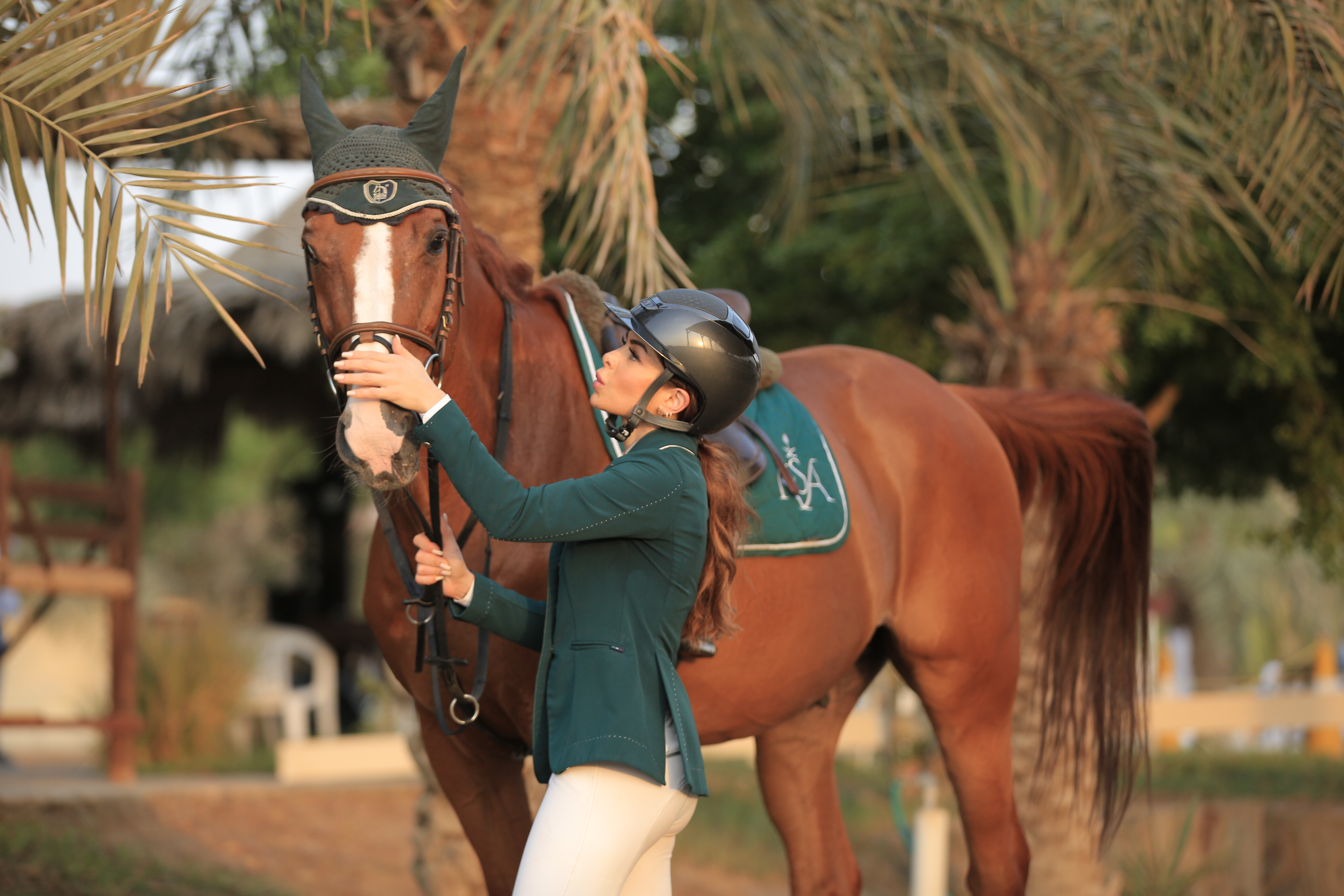

Personal information
- Nationality: Saudi Arabian
- Born: 1992 (age 33–34); Ohio, United States

Dalma Malhas (Arabic: دلما ملحس) is an equestrian. She was supposed to be the first Saudi female athlete to compete at the Summer Olympics.

When she rode at the inaugural Youth Olympic Games in 2010, she was amongst a high-profile group of speakers who addressed the recent International Olympic Committee Women and Sport conference in Los Angeles. The 20-year-old, who won individual bronze in Singapore, spoke of her hope of gender equality in all sports.

== Biography ==
Dalma Rushdi Malhas was born in Ohio in 1992. She speaks English, French, Italian, as well as her native language, Arabic.

At the age of four, Dalma began riding horses. At the age of 12, she traveled to Rome where she started to compete in more advanced competitions under the supervision of Duccio Bartalucci, a former coach for the national Olympic show jumping team of Italy. She then went to France and trained there at the Forsan Equestrian Centre in Chantilly.

After participating in several competitions abroad, the International Olympic Committee (IOC) became aware of Malhas. Due to the fact that each country has to field a minimum of one woman in the mandatory quota set by the IOC in order for a nation to take part in the Games, the IOC invited Malhas to represent Saudi Arabia, although her links with that country are not strong. When interviewed during the Youth Olympics in Singapore in 2010, she admitted: "I didn’t care much about me being there as a representative of Saudi Arabia, because anyone could probably do that. But getting a medal was the key, and that’s not easy for anyone, and I wanted that – and only that gives recognition to my country".

Malhas was set to compete at the 2012 Summer Olympics in London. It would have been the first time a woman had represented Saudi Arabia at an Olympic Games and she would have been the only female Saudi athlete to have competed in any Olympic sport. However, Malhas was disqualified from the Games in late June for failing to meet minimum eligibility standards, according to the International Equestrian Federation.
