= Martin Fuchs =

Swiss Olympic show jumping rider (born 1992)

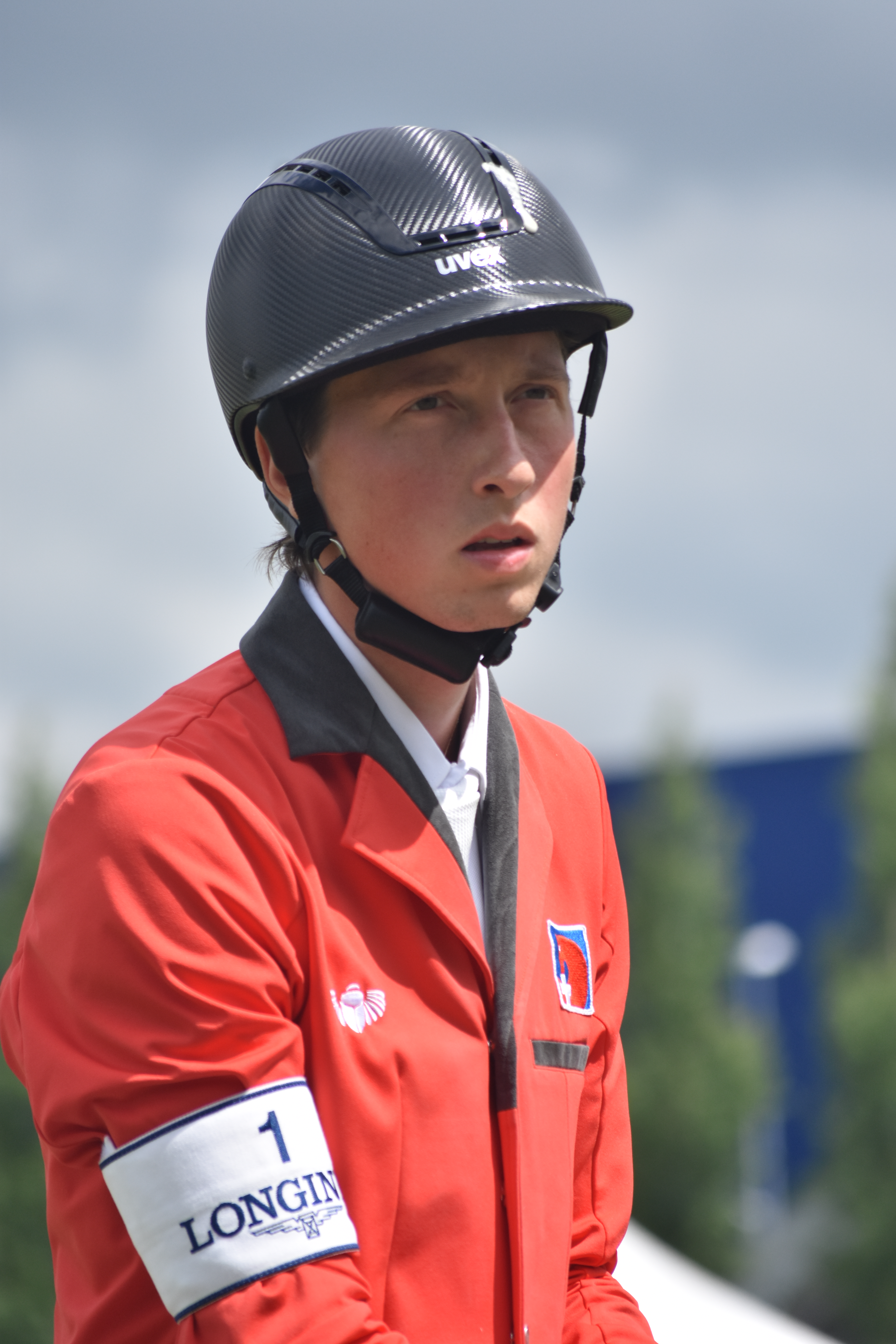
- Fuchs in 2016

Personal information
- Discipline: Jumping
- Born: 13 July 1992 (age 34); Bietenholz, Zurich, Switzerland
- Height: 1.84 m (6 ft 0 in)
- Weight: 71 kg (157 lb)
Medal record
Equestrian
Representing Switzerland
World Championships
Silver medal – second place	2018 Tryon	Individual jumping
European Championships
Gold medal – first place	2019 Rotterdam	Individual jumping
Gold medal – first place	2021 Riesenbeck	Team jumping
Silver medal – second place	2021 Riesenbeck	Individual jumping
Bronze medal – third place	2015 Aachen	Team jumping
Bronze medal – third place	2017 Gothenburg	Team jumping
World Cup
Gold medal – first place	2022 Leipzig	Individual jumping
Silver medal – second place	2019 Gothenburg	Individual jumping
Representing (International Olympic Committee) Mixed-NOCs team
Youth Olympic Games
Gold medal – first place	2010 Singapore	Team jumping

Martin Fuchs (born 13 July 1992) is a Swiss Olympic show jumping rider. He competed at the 2016 Summer Olympics in Rio de Janeiro, Brazil, where he finished sixth in the team and ninth in the individual competition. In 2019 he won the individual gold at the 2019 European Championship in Rotterdam. As of 31 May 2022, he is ranked as the World Number 1 showjumper by the FEI.

Martin's uncle Markus Fuchs is a five-time Olympian and won a team silver in show jumping at the 2000 Summer Olympics. His father, Thomas, competed at the 1992 Olympics in Barcelona and his mother, Renata, was also an elite show jumper.

== Early life ==
Fuchs' grandfather brought horses into the family, opening a riding school and dealing horses at his farm, making a successful business. Fuchs began riding when he was five years old and competed for the first time when he was seven. He was always ambitious, and in 2010, he competed in the inaugural Youth Olympic Games in Singapore where he won team gold with a mixed European team. He also finished 9th individually.

His first medal at the Youth Olympics started his regular medal winning. In 2012, Fuchs won the FEI European Young Rider Championship gold medal on Principal 12 and the following year won team gold and individual silver on PSG Future. As of the beginning of 2020, Fuchs had 12 medals in his 12 years of international competition.

His family has been close to Steve Guerdat, world champion and current world #29, since he moved back to Switzerland. Fuchs' parents helped Guerdat and he spent much time at their farm. He is considered family and his stable is just five miles away from the Fuchs' yard.

== Professional career ==
Fuchs had been set on riding professionally since he was seven years old. In 2015, he competed in his first senior championship at the European Championship in Aachen (GER) where the Swiss team won the bronze medal. He also competed the 2015 FEI World Cup Jumping Finals in Las Vegas, NV (USA) on PSG Future where he was 11th individually. Fuchs jumped Clooney 51 at the 2016 Olympic Games in Rio de Janeiro and finished 9th individually. The following year he was 4th at the 2017 World Cup Finals in Omaha, NE (USA) on Clooney 51, and won a second European Championship team bronze in Gothenburg (SWE). In 2018 Fuchs had his most successful championship year to date, finishing 2nd individually at the World Equestrian Games in Tryon, NC on Clooney 51. He topped the previous year by finishing 2nd at the 2020 FEI World Cup Jumping Finals in Gothenburg (SWE) and won the individual gold at the European Championships in Rotterdam (NED), all on Clooney 51. In January 2020, Fuchs became the World #1 ranked rider, surpassing friend and teammate Steve Guerdat. He is ranked world #2 as of May 2020.

Fuchs has been supported by generous owners for much of his career. Most notable is Luigi Baleri, who had been a friend of Thomas Fuchs outside of riding, and eventually trained with him and owned horses for other riders. Baleri has owned horses for Fuchs since he was 14 years old, and has won the Jumping Owners Club owner of the year award twice, in 2018 and 2019. The pair have a close relationship and Fuchs considers Baleri a second father and a very easy owner. He currently owns Clooney 51, The Sinner, Silver Shine, and Logan. Fuchs is also partnered with Adolfo Juri, whom Fuchs' uncle, Markus, rode for in the past. Juri owns Chiza BZ and Leone Jei. Other sponsors of Fuchs include Jacques & Pierre Bodenmüller (Tam Tam du Valon), Gregoire Oberson (original owner of Clooney 51), and Laura Connelly of DarkHorse (Faberlys, Idara).

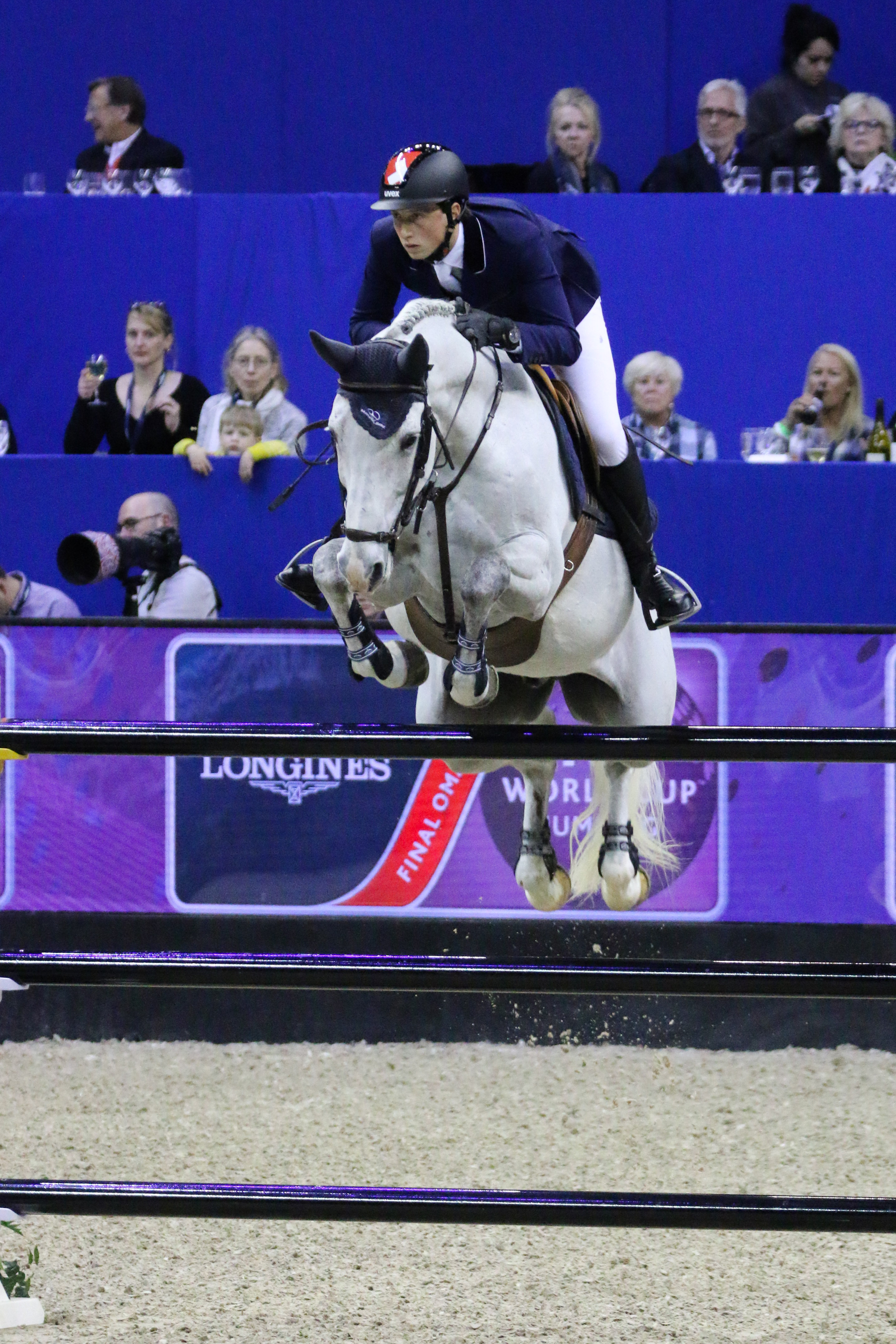
Fuchs and Clooney 51 at the 2017 FEI World Cup Jumping Finals in Omaha, NE (USA)

Fuchs currently rides for the London Knights in the Global Champions League, one of the most successful teams in the championship and the current reigning champions. He is teammates with Ben Maher, Olivier Philippaerts, Nicola Philippaerts, Cameron Hanley, and Emily Moffit.

== Major results ==
Recent major results
Year	Place	Horse	Event	Rating	Show	Location
2020	1	Stalando 2	$137,000 Equinimity WEF Challenge Cup	CSI5*	Winter Equestrian Festival	Wellington, FL (USA)
2020	1	Silver Shine	CaptiveOne Advisors 1.50m Classic	CSI4*	Winter Equestrian Festival	Wellington, FL (USA)
2019	1	The Sinner	London World Cup Qualifier Grand Prix	CSI5*-W	London Olympia	London (UK)
2019	1	Clooney 51	Rolex Grand Prix of Geneva	CSI5*	CHI Geneva	Geneva (SUI)
2019	1	Tam Tam du Valon	Mercedes German Master	CSI5*-W	Stuttgart German Masters	Stuttgart (GER)
2019	1	Chica B Z	Aragon Robotics Prize 1.55m	CSI5*-W	Stuttgart German Masters	Stuttgart (GER)
2019	1	Tam Tam du Valon	Selleria Equipe 1.55m	CSI5*-W	Jumping Verona	Verona (ITA)
2019	1	Clooney 51	Lyon World Cup Qualifier Grand Prix	CSI5*-W	Longines Equita Lyon	Lyon (FRA)
2019	Gold	Clooney 51	European Championships - Individual	CH-EU	European Championship	Rotterdam (NLD)
2019	1	Chaplin	LGCT Grand Prix of Cascais	CSI5*	LGCT Cascais, Estoril	Cascais (PRT)
2019	1	Chaplin	GCL Team Competition of Cascais	CSI5*	LGCT Cascais, Estroil	Cascais (PRT)
2019	1	Chaplin	LGCT Grand Prix of Madrid	CSI5*	LGCT Madrid	Madrid (SPA)
2019	2	Clooney 51	FEI World Cup Jumping Finals	WC	World Cup Finals	Gothenburg (SWE)
2019	1	Clooney 51	$391,000 Fidelity Investments Grand Prix	CSI5*	Winter Equestrian Festival	Wellington, FL (USA)
2019	1	Clooney 51	Longines Grand Prix of Basel	CSI5*-W	Longines CSI Basel	Basel (SUI)
2018	1	Clooney 51	Lyon World Cup Qualifier	CSI5*-W	Longines Equita Lyon	Lyon (FRA)
2018	Silver	Clooney 51	World Equestrian Games	WEG	World Equestrian Games	Tryon, NC (USA)
2018	1	Clooney 51	Longines Grand Prix of Zurich	CSI5*-W	Longines Zurich	Zurich (SUI)
2018	1	Clooney 51	Longines Grand Prix of Basel	CSI5*	Longines CSI Basel	Basel (SUI)
2017	Bronze	Clooney 51	European Championships - Team	CH-EU	European Championships	Gothenburg (SWE)
2017	1-tie	Clooney 51	Glock's Grand Prix	CSI5*	Villach Treffen	Treffen (AUT)
2017	4	Clooney 51	FEI World Cup Jumping Finals	WC	World Cup Finals	Omaha, NE (USA)
