= Marcelo Chirico =

Uruguayan equestrian (born 1992)

Personal information
- Nationality: Uruguay
- Born: March 16, 1992 (age 34) Rivera, Uruguay

Sport
- Sport: Equestrian
- Event: Show jumper
Medal record
Equestrian
Representing Uruguay
Youth Olympic Games
Gold medal – first place	2010 Singapore	Individual jumping

Marcelo Chirico (born March 16, 1992, in Rivera) is a Uruguayan equestrian and show jumping competitor.

At the 2010 Summer Youth Olympics in Singapore, Chirico won the gold medal in the individual jumping event, becoming the first athlete from Uruguay to win an individual Olympic Gold medal.

In September 2011, Chirico was named the flag bearer for the Uruguayan team at the 2011 Pan American Games in Guadalajara, Mexico.

== Horses ==
- Links Hot Gossip - 2010
- Omanie du Landais - 2011-2012
- Mondain Normand - 2012

== Career highlights ==
2009

- 1st place in the Campeonato Gaúcho for Young Riders Porto Alegre, Brazil

2010

- Gold medal at the 2010 Summer Youth Olympics in Singapore
- 1st place in the Campeonato Gaúcho for Young Riders Porto Alegre, Brazil

2011

- 1st place in the Campeonato Gaúcho for Young Riders Porto Alegre, Brazil
- 1st place in the Sol de Mayo Tournament Buenos Aires, Argentina
- 4th place in the CSI-W Haras Larissa São Paulo, Brazil
- 43rd place in the 2011 Pan American Games

2012

- 5th place in the CSI** Hardelot, France
- 5th place in the CSI** Metz, France
