= Samantha McIntosh =

New Zealand equestrian

Samantha (Sam) McIntosh is a showjumper and equestrian from New Zealand.

== Life ==
McIntosh is the daughter of two riders, trainers and showjumpers, Penny Stevenson and Colin McIntosh. She was born and grew up in Kaikohe, in the North Island of New Zealand, and began showjumping when she was about 15 years old.

McIntosh moved to Europe when she was 17 years old and worked as a stablehand for Thomas Fuchs, Marcus Mändli and then in Germany with Lüthi Orschel. In 1998 she signed a contract with Orschel which included adopting dual New Zealand-Bulgarian citizenship, and began riding for Bulgaria. McIntosh competed for Bulgaria at the 2000 and 2004 Olympic Games, the World Equestrian Games, the European Championships and the FEI World Cup.

In 2008 McIntosh relinquished Bulgarian citizenship and in 2011 she returned home to New Zealand. She spent three years based in Cambridge and built up her own sports horse stable, ran a team of showjumpers and became involved in coaching. In 2014 she was appointed as an advisor to the board of Equestrian Sport New Zealand, and the following year she returned to Europe, to the stables of Joelle Cairaschi-Dagut in La Teste de Buch, France.

McIntosh competed for New Zealand in the FEI Nations Cup in 2017. In 2018, she was part of the team of four New Zealand riders who won the FEI Nations Cup, the first time a New Zealand team has won it.
