= Ukraine at the Youth Olympics =

- IOC code: UKR
- NOC: National Olympic Committee of Ukraine
- Website: www.noc-ukr.org (in Ukrainian and English)
- Medals Ranked 10th: Gold 22 Silver 26 Bronze 31 Total 79

Summer appearances
- 2010; 2014; 2018; 2026

Winter appearances
- 2012; 2016; 2020; 2024

Ukraine competed at the Youth Olympic Games for the first time in 2010 in Singapore, and has participated in every Games since then.

The National Olympic Committee for Ukraine is the National Olympic Committee of Ukraine, which was created in 1990 and recognized in 1993.

Ukrainian athletes have won 74 medals at the Summer Youth Games, and 5 at the Winter Youth Games.

== Medal tables ==
=== Medals by Summer Games ===
Games	Athletes	Gold	Silver	Bronze	Total	Rank
2010 Singapore	55	9	9	15	33	4
(China) 2014 Nanjing	58	7	8	8	23	6
(Argentina) 2018 Buenos Aires	36	5	7	6	18	10
Total		21	24	29	74	6

=== Medals by Winter Games ===
Games	Athletes	Gold	Silver	Bronze	Total	Rank
(Austria) 2012 Innsbruck	23	0	1	0	1	24
(Norway) 2016 Lillehammer	23	1	0	0	1	17
(Switzerland) 2020 Lausanne	39	0	0	1	1	29
(South Korea) 2024 Gangwon	44	0	1	1	2	26
Total		1	2	2	5	26

=== Medals by summer sport ===
Sport	Gold	Silver	Bronze	Total
Athletics	8	2	7	17
Swimming	5	3	2	10
Gymnastics	3	5	4	12
Shooting	2	0	1	3
Boxing	1	2	0	3
Rowing	1	1	0	2
Fencing	1	0	0	1
Diving	0	4	1	5
Wrestling	0	2	4	6
Taekwondo	0	2	2	4
Canoeing	0	2	1	3
Judo	0	1	3	4
Weightlifting	0	0	2	2
Cycling	0	0	1	1
Modern pentathlon	0	0	1	1
Totals (15 entries)	21	24	29	74

=== Medals by winter sport ===
Sport	Gold	Silver	Bronze	Total
Biathlon	1	0	1	2
Figure skating	0	1	0	1
Skeleton	0	1	0	1
Freestyle skiing	0	0	1	1
Totals (4 entries)	1	2	2	5

== List of medalists ==
2010 Summer Youth Olympics - Singapore

Medal	Name	Sport	Event
Gold	Daryna Zevina	Swimming	Youth Women's 100m Backstroke
Gold	Andrii Govorov	Swimming	Youth Men's 50m Freestyle
Gold	Andrii Govorov	Swimming	Youth Men's 50m Butterfly
Gold	Oleksandr Satin	Gymnastics	Men's Trampoline
Gold	Oleg Stepko	Gymnastics	Men's Pommel Horse
Gold	Oleg Stepko	Gymnastics	Men's Parallel Bars
Gold	Igor Lyashchenko	Athletics	Boys' 10000m walk
Gold	Kateryna Derun	Athletics	Girls' Javelin throw
Gold	Denys Kushnirov	Shooting	10m Air Pistol Men Junior
Silver	Iryna Romoldanova	Taekwondo	Women's 44kg
Silver	Olexandr Lytvynov	Wrestling	Men's Greco-Roman 58kg
Silver	Nataliia Kovalova	Rowing	Junior Women's Single Sculls
Silver	Oleg Stepko	Gymnastics	Men's Individual All-Around final
Silver	Daryna Zevina	Swimming	Youth Women's 200m Backstroke
Silver	Oleg Stepko	Gymnastics	Men's Floor Exercise
Silver	Anatolii Melnyk	Canoeing	C1 Head to head Canoe Sprint Men
Silver	Oleksandr Bondar	Diving	Youth Men's 3m Springboard
Silver	Oleksandr Bondar	Diving	Youth Men's 10m Platform
Bronze	Karyna Stankova	Wrestling	Women's Freestyle 70kg
Bronze	Daryna Zevina	Swimming	Youth Women's 200m Backstroke
Bronze	Kostyantyn Reva	Weightlifting	Men's 85kg
Bronze	Maksim Dominishin	Taekwondo	Men's 73kg
Bronze	Anastasiya Spas	Modern pentathlon	Girls' Individual
Bronze	Viktor Chernysh	Athletics	Boys' High Jump
Bronze	Ganna Shelekh	Athletics	Girls' Pole Vault
Bronze	Dmytro Atanov	Judo	Boys' −55kg
Bronze	Serhiy Kulish	Shooting	10m Air Rifle Men Junior
Bronze	Ganna Aleksandrova	Athletics	Girls' Triple jump
Bronze	Olena Kolesnychenko	Athletics	Girls' 400m Hurdles
Bronze	Oksana Raita	Athletics	Girls' 2000m Steeplechase
Bronze	Viktoriya Potyekhina	Diving	Youth Women's 3m Springboard
Bronze	Kseniya Darchuk	Judo	Girls' −78kg
Bronze	Anatolii Melnyk	Canoeing	C1 Slalom Men

(Austria) 2012 Winter Youth Olympics - Innsbruck

Medal	Name	Sport	Event
Silver	Oleksandra Nazarova; Maxim Nikitin	Figure Skating	Ice Dancing

(China) 2014 Summer Youth Olympics - Nanjing

Medal	Name	Sport	Event
Gold	Hlib Piskunov	Athletics	Boys' Hammer throw
Gold	Yelyzaveta Baby	Athletics	Girls' Long jump
Gold	Yuliya Levchenko	Athletics	Girls' High jump
Gold	Ramil Gadzhyiev	Boxing	Boys' -75 kg
Gold	Pavlo Korostylov	Shooting	Boys' 10m Air Pistol
Gold	Mykhailo Romanchuk	Swimming	Boys' 400 metre freestyle
Gold	Anastasiya Malyavina	Swimming	Girls' 200 metre breaststroke
Silver	Dzhois Koba	Athletics	Girls' 200 metres
Silver	Al'Ona Byelyakova	Athletics	Girls' Discus throw
Silver	Denys Voronovskyy	Taekwondo	Boys' 73 kg
Silver	Liudmyla Luzan	Canoeing	Girls' C1 sprint
Silver	Hanna Krasnoshlyk	Diving	Girls' 3m springboard
Silver	Vladyslav Hryko	Gymnastics	Boys' Pommel horse
Silver	Bogdan Iadov	Judo	Boys' 66 kg
Silver	Mykhailo Romanchuk	Swimming	Boys' 800 m freestyle
Bronze	Darya Tkachova; Vladyslav Nizitskyi; Rinat Udod; Anzhelika Teterych	Cycling	Mixed team relay
Bronze	Ruslan Valitovo	Athletics	Boys' Discus throw
Bronze	Vladyslav Hryko	Gymnastics	Boys' Rings
Bronze	Anastasiya Malyavina	Swimming	Girls' 100 metre breaststroke
Bronze	Yuliia Miiuts	Taekwondo	Girls' +63 kg
Bronze	Sofiya Zenchenko	Weightlifting	Girls' 63 kg
Bronze	Aleksey Masyk	Wrestling	Boys' Greco-Roman 42 kg
Bronze	Olena Kremzer	Wrestling	Girls' Freestyle 52 kg

(Norway) 2016 Winter Youth Olympics - Lillehammer

Medal	Name	Sport	Event
Gold	Khrystyna Dmytrenko	Biathlon	Girls' Pursuit

(Argentina) 2018 Summer Youth Olympics - Buenos Aires

Medal	Name	Sport	Event
Gold	Kateryna Chorniy	Fencing	Girls' épée
Gold	Mykhaylo Kokhan	Athletics	Boys' Hammer throw
Gold	Valeriya Ivanenko	Athletics	Girls' Hammer throw
Gold	Ivan Tyshchenko	Rowing	Boys' Single Sculls
Gold	Yaroslava Mahuchikh	Athletics	Girls' High jump
Silver	Maksym Halinichev	Boxing	Boys' Bantamweight
Silver	Taras Bondarchuk	Boxing	Boys' Lightweight
Silver	Oksana Chudyk	Wrestling	Girls' Freestyle 65 kg
Silver	Khrystyna Pohranychna	Gymnastics	Girls' Rhythmic individual All-around
Silver	Sofiya Lyskun	Diving	Girls' 10m Platform
Silver	Nazar Chepurnyi	Gymnastics	Boys' Vault
Silver	Denys Kesil	Swimming	Boys' 200 metre Butterfly
Bronze	Oleh Veredyba	Judo	Boys' 55 kg
Bronze	Anastasia Bachynska	Gymnastics	Girls' Artistic individual All-around
Bronze	Daryna Plokhotniuk; Oleksandr Madei	Gymnastics	Acrobatic mixed Pairs
Bronze	Oleh Doroshchuk	Athletics	Boys' High jump
Bronze	Anastasia Bachynska	Gymnastics	Girls' Floor exercise
Bronze	Vladyslav Ostapenko	Wrestling	Boys' Freestyle 55 kg

(Switzerland) 2020 Winter Youth Olympics - Lausanne

Medal	Name	Sport	Event
Bronze	Orest Kovalenko	Freestyle skiing	Boys' big air

(South Korea) 2024 Winter Youth Olympics - Gangwon

Medal	Name	Sport	Event
Silver	Yaroslav Lavreniuk	Skeleton	Men's
Bronze	Polina Putsko	Biathlon	Women's sprint

== Participating athletes ==
• = Ukrainians did not compete, × = the sport was not contested at the Games

=== Participants by Summer Games ===
Event	10	14	18	26	Years
Archery	2	2	2		3
Athletics	15	14	13		3
Badminton	1	2	2		3
Baseball5	×	×	×		—
Basketball	•	•	8		1
Beach handball	×	×	•		—
Beach volleyball	×	2	•		1
Beach wrestling	×	×	×		—
Boxing	2	4	2		3
Breaking	×	×	•		—
Canoeing	3	2	2	×	3
Coastal rowing	×	×	×		—
Cycling	•	4	2		2
Diving	2	2	2	×	3
Equestrian	•	•	•		—
Fencing	2	1	1		3
Futsal	×	×	•		—
Gymnastics	5	2	5		3
Judo	2	2	2		3
Karate	×	×	1	×	1
Modern pentathlon	2	2	1	×	3
Rowing	2	2	1	×	3
Rugby sevens	×	•	•		—
Sailing	2	1	•		2
Shooting	2	3	1	×	3
Skateboarding	×	×	×		—
Sport climbing	×	×	1	×	1
Swimming	3	4	4		3
Table tennis	•	•	•		—
Taekwondo	2	3	1		3
Tennis	2	1	2	×	3
Triathlon	1	1	•		2
Weightlifting	2	2	•	×	2
Wrestling	3	2	2	×	3
Wushu	×	×	×		—
Total sports	19	21	20		

=== Participants by Winter Games ===
Event	12	16	20	24	Years
Alpine skiing	2	2	2	2	4
Biathlon	4	4	8	8	4
Bobsleigh	•	•	•	•	—
Cross-country skiing	2	2	4	4	4
Curling	•	•	•	2	1
Figure skating	6	7	5	3	4
Freestyle skiing	•	•	1	4	2
Ice hockey	•	•	3	•	1
Luge	6	4	6	9	4
Nordic combined	1	1	2	2	4
Short track speed skating	1	•	2	3	3
Skeleton	•	1	1	2	3
Ski jumping	1	1	4	4	4
Ski mountaineering	×	×	•	×	—
Snowboarding	•	1	1	1	3
Speed skating	•	•	•	•	—
Total sports	8	9	12	12	

== See also ==
- Ukraine at the Olympics
- Ukraine at the Paralympics
