= Modern pentathlon at the Summer Youth Olympics =

- Governing body: UIPM
- Events: 3 (men: 1; womens: 1; mixed: 1)

Games
- 2010; 2014; 2018

Modern pentathlon was introduced at the Youth Olympic Games at the inaugural edition in 2010 for both boys, girls and mixed relay. In the 2010 Summer Youth Olympics in Singapore it consisted of four of the five modern pentathlon disciplines: fencing, swimming, running and shooting. There was no riding. In 2014 Summer Youth Olympics and 2018 Summer Youth Olympics it consisted of five modern pentathlon disciplines: fencing, swimming, running, shooting, and horse riding.

== Qualification ==
Each National Olympic Committee (NOC) can enter a maximum of 2 competitors, 1 per each gender. The spots were reallocated to the world rankings. The remaining 42 places shall be decided in three stages; firstly four continental qualification tournaments, World Youth A Championships and finally the Olympic Youth A Pentathlon World Rankings.

== Events ==
Modern pentathlon has been on the Olympic program continuously since 2010.

Event	10	14	18	Years
Boy's individual	•	•	•	3
Mixed relay	•	•	•	3
Girl's individual	•	•	•	3
Total Events	3	3	3	

== Medal table ==
Rank	Nation	Gold	Silver	Bronze	Total
1	Mixed-NOCs	3	3	3	9
2	Egypt	2	0	0	2
3	Russia	1	2	0	3
4	Chile	1	0	0	1
4	Cuba	1	0	0	1
4	South Korea	1	0	0	1
7	Hungary	0	2	1	3
8	France	0	1	1	2
9	Great Britain	0	1	0	1
10	Germany	0	0	1	1
10	Lithuania	0	0	1	1
10	Mexico	0	0	1	1
10	Ukraine	0	0	1	1
Totals (13 entries)		9	9	9	27

=== Medalists ===
Event	Gold	Silver	Bronze
Boys' individual (2010)	Kim Dae-Beom; South Korea	Ilya Shugarov; Russia	Jorge Camacho; Mexico
Girls' individual (2010)	Leydi Moya; Cuba	Zsófia Földházi; Hungary	Anastasiya Spas; Ukraine
Mixed relay (2010)	Anastasiya Spas; Ukraine; Ilya Shugarov; Russia	Zhu Wenjing; China; Kim Dae-Beom; South Korea	Gulnaz Gubaydullina; Russia; Lukas Kontrimavicius; Lithuania
Boys' individual (2014)	Alexander Lifanov; Russia	Gergely Regos; Hungary	Dovidas Vaivada; Lithuania
Girls' individual (2014)	Zhong Xiuting; China	Francesca Summers; Great Britain	Anna Matthes; Germany
Mixed relay (2014)	Maria Teixeira; Portugal; Anton Kuznetsov; Ukraine	Anna Zs Tóth; Hungary; Ricardo Vera; Mexico	Aurora Tognetti; Italy; Gilung Park; South Korea
Boys' individual (2018)	Ahmed El-Gendy; Egypt	Egor Gromadskii; Russia	Ugo Fleurot; France
Girls' individual (2018)	Salma Abdelmaksoud; Egypt	Emma Riff; France	Michelle Gulyás; Hungary
Mixed relay (2018)	Gu Yewen; China; Ahmed El-Gendy; Egypt	Salma Abdelmaksoud; Egypt; Franco Serrano; Argentina	Laura Heredia; Spain; Kamil Kasperczak; Poland
