= Modern pentathlon at the 2010 Summer Youth Olympics =

Modern pentathlon at the I Summer Youth Olympic Games
- Venue: Singapore Sports School
- Dates: 21 – 23 August 2010
- No. of events: 3 (1 boys, 1 girls, 1 mixed)
- Competitors: 48 (24 boys, 24 girls) from 28 nations

Modern pentathlon at the 2010 Summer Youth Olympics in Singapore took place August 21–23. It consisted of four of the five modern pentathlon disciplines: fencing, swimming, running and shooting. There was no riding.

== Qualified athletes ==
=== Boys ===
Name	Country
Todd Renfree	Australia
Aliaksandr Biruk	Belarus
William Muinhos	Brazil
Doycho Ivanov	Bulgaria
Han Jiahao	China
Martin Bilko	Czech Republic
Eslam Hamad	Egypt
Aleix Heredia	Spain
Valentin Prades	France
Eric Kruger	Germany
Jorge David Imeri Cabrera	Guatemala
Gergely Demeter	Hungary
Andrea Micalizzi	Italy
German Sobolev	Kazakhstan
Ilias Baktybekov	Kyrgyzstan
Kim Dae-Beom	South Korea
Lukas Kontrimavicius	Lithuania
Jorge Camacho	Mexico
Karol Dziudziek	Poland
Ilya Shugarov	Russia
Jan Szalay	Slovakia
Yuriy Fedechko	Ukraine
Greg Longden	Great Britain
Nathan Schrimsher	United States

=== Girls ===
Name	Country
Marharyta Maseikava	Belarus
Mariana Laporte	Brazil
Beatriche Gencheva	Bulgaria
Zhu Wenjing	China
Leydi Moya	Cuba
Alice Lencova	Czech Republic
Jihan El Midany	Egypt
Nuria Chavarria	Spain
Manon Carpentier	France
Franziska Hanko	Germany
Zsófia Földházi	Hungary
Emily Greenan	Ireland
Gloria Tocchi	Italy
Dilyara Ilyassova	Kazakhstan
Choi Min Ji	South Korea
Sindija Roga	Latvia
Gintare Venckauskaite	Lithuania
Tamara Vega	Mexico
Anna Maliszewska	Poland
Gulnaz Gubaydullina	Russia
Valeria Lim	Singapore
Ela Sedilekova	Slovakia
Anastasiya Spas	Ukraine
Anna Olesinski	United States

== Competition schedule ==
Event date	Event day	Event time	Competition
21 August	Saturday	11:00	Girls
22 August	Sunday	11:00	Boys
24 August	Tuesday	11:00	Mixed

== Medal summary ==
=== Medal table ===
Rank	Nation	Gold	Silver	Bronze	Total
1	Cuba	1	0	0	1
1	South Korea	1	0	0	1
3	Hungary	0	1	0	1
3	Russia	0	1	0	1
5	Mexico	0	0	1	1
5	Ukraine	0	0	1	1
Totals (6 entries)		2	2	2	6

=== Events ===
Event	Gold	Silver	Bronze
Boys' individual	Kim Dae-Beom; South Korea	Ilya Shugarov; Russia	Jorge Camacho; Mexico
Girls' individual	Leydi Moya; Cuba	Zsófia Földházi; Hungary	Anastasiya Spas; Ukraine
Mixed relay	Anastasiya Spas; Ukraine; Ilya Shugarov; Russia	Zhu Wenjing; China; Kim Dae-Beom; South Korea	Gulnaz Gubaydullina; Russia; Lukas Kontrimavicius; Lithuania
