= Modern pentathlon at the 2010 Summer Youth Olympics – Mixed relay =

The mixed team's Modern pentathlon competitions at the 2010 Summer Youth Olympics in Singapore were held on August 24, at the Singapore Sports School.

Each team contained one male and one female pentathlete. Only the fencing, swimming, shooting and running portions were done at the Youth Olympics. The results of each of the four segments of the modern pentathlon were converted into points scores based on a par value of 1000 points per event. Competitors doing better than par would receive more points. At the end of the first two segments, the points would be calculated and the pentathletes would be handicapped for the final segment based on their scores such that a simultaneous finish in that segment would result in identical overall scores.

The first segment was a mass round robin one touch épée, the second was a 2x100 metre freestyle swimming relay and the final segment was combined running and shooting where athletes ran the 2x1500 metre relay and shot using the laser pistol.

== Medalists ==
Gold	Silver	Bronze
Anastasiya Spas; Ukraine; Ilya Shugarov; Russia	Wenjing Zhu; China; Kim Dae-beom; South Korea	Gulnaz Gubaydullina; Russia; Lukas Kontrimavicius; Lithuania

== Results ==
Rank	Athlete	Fencing		Swimming		Running and Shooting		Total
Rank	Athlete	Wins-Loss	Points	Total Time	Points	Total Time	Points	Total
Gold medal	Anastasiya Spas (UKR); Ilya Shugarov (RUS)	63-29	990	2:02.25	1336	15:42.32	2312	4638
Silver medal	Wenjing Zhu (CHN); Kim Dae-beom (KOR)	50-42	860	2:02.99	1328	15:17.11	2412	4600
Bronze medal	Gulnaz Gubaydullina (RUS); Lukas Kontrimavicius (LTU)	35-57	710	1:59.05	1372	14:59.91	2484	4566
4	Zsófia Földházi (HUN); Aliaksandr Biruk (BLR)	45-47	810	1:58.39	1380	15:36.70	2336	4526
5	Tamara Vega (MEX); Eric Kruger (GER)	49-43	850	2:07.95	1268	15:23.66	2388	4506
6	Anna Olesinski (USA); Jiahao Han (CHN)	46-46	820	2:04.24	1312	15:34.18	2344	4476
7	Ela Sedilekova (SVK); Valentin Prades (FRA)	56-36	920	2:10.03	1240	15:45.63	2300	4460
7	Valerie Lim (SIN); Yuriy Fedechko (UKR)	36-56	720	2:04.24	1312	15:13.54	2428	4460
9	Gintare Venckauskaite (LTU); Martin Bilko (CZE)	40-52	760	2:05.10	1300	15:28.38	2368	4428
10	Emily Greenan (IRL); Jorge Camacho (MEX)	55-37	910	2:06.35	1284	16:11.37	2196	4390
11	Anna Maliszewska (POL); Todd Renfree (AUS)	50-42	860	2:11.65	1224	15:50.67	2280	4364
11	Franziska Hanko (GER); Karol Dziudziek (POL)	44-48	800	2:09.59	1248	15:41.42	2316	4364
13	Min Ji Choi (KOR); Eslam Hamad (EGY)	44-48	800	2:00.06	1360	16:28.41	2128	4288
14	Gloria Tocchi (ITA); Andrea Micalizzi (ITA)	47-45	830	2:04.80	1304	16:28.76	2128	4262
15	Jihan El Midany (EGY); Ilias Baktybekov (KGZ)	46-46	820	2:07.74	1268	16:23.84	2148	4236
16	Leydi Laura Moya Lopez (CUB); Nathan Schrimsher (USA)	38-54	740	2:03.98	1316	16:33.21	2108	4164
17	Manon Carpentier (FRA); William Muinhos (BRA)	35-57	710	2:06.88	1280	16:17.28	2172	4162
18	Beatriche Gencheva (BUL); Doycho Ivanov (BUL)	48-44	840	2:08.15	1264	16:54.85	2024	4128
19	Marharyta Maseikava (BLR); German Sobolev (KAZ)	44-48	800	2:07.98	1268	16:49.94	2044	4112
20	Nuria Chavarria (ESP); Jorge David Imeri Cabrera (GUA)	54-38	900	2:13.18	1204	17:00.81	2000	4104
21	Dilyara Ilyassova (KAZ); Aleix Heredia (ESP)	56-36	920	2:20.06	1120	16:57.64	2012	4052
22	Sindija Roga (LAT); Gergely Demeter (HUN)	34-58	700	2:03.78	1316	17:03.05	1988	4004
23	Alice Lencova (CZE); Greg Longden (GBR)	39-53	750	2:04.66	1304	17:19.72	1924	3978
24	Mariana Laporte (BRA); Jan Szalay (SVK)	45-47	810	2:07.62	1272	19:56.98	1296	3378
