= Ukraine at the 2010 Summer Youth Olympics =

- IOC code: UKR
- NOC: National Olympic Committee of Ukraine
- Website: www.noc-ukr.org

in Singapore
- Competitors: 55 in 18 sports
- Flag bearer: Alina Komaschuk
- Medals Ranked 4th: Gold 9 Silver 9 Bronze 15 Total 33

Summer Youth Olympics appearances (overview)
- 2010; 2014; 2018

Ukraine participated in the 2010 Summer Youth Olympics in Singapore.

Serhiy Kulish (shooting) competed at the 2012, 2016, 2020, and 2024 Summer Olympics. Lidiia Sichenikova (archery), Daryna Zevina (swimming) represented Ukraine at the 2012, 2016, and 2020 Summer Olympics. Elina Svitolina (tennis) represented Ukraine at the 2016, 2020, and 2024 Summer Olympics. Andriy Hovorov (swimming) competed at the 2012 and 2016 Games. Alina Komashchuk (fencing) entered the Olympic competitions at the 2016 and 2024 Games. Hanna Shelekh (athletics), Oleksandr Bondar and Viktoriya Potyekhina (both diving), Oleh Stepko (gymnastics), Denys Kushnirov (shooting) competed at the 2012 Summer Olympics. Kateryna Derun (athletics), Andriy Fedechko and Anastasiya Spas (both modern pentathlon) competed at the 2016 Summer Olympics. Mariia Kichasova (canoeing) represented Ukraine at the 2020 Summer Olympics. As of 2024 Games, Kulish (2016, 2024), Komashchuk (2016, 2024), and Svitolina (2020) won Olympic medals in their sports, with Kulish being the only one from the 2010 Games Ukrainian team who has won medals at both Youth and senior Olympics.

== Medalists ==
Medal	Name	Sport	Event	Date
Gold	Daryna Zevina	Swimming	Youth women's 100m backstroke	16 Aug
Gold	Andrii Govorov	Swimming	Youth men's 50m freestyle	18 Aug
Gold	Andrii Govorov	Swimming	Youth men's 50m Butterfly	19 Aug
Gold	Oleksandr Satin	Gymnastics	Men's Trampoline	20 Aug
Gold	Oleg Stepko	Gymnastics	Men's pommel horse	21 Aug
Gold	Oleg Stepko	Gymnastics	Men's parallel Bars	22 Aug
Gold	Igor Lyashchenko	Athletics	Boys' 10000m walk	22 Aug
Gold	Kateryna Derun	Athletics	Girls' Javelin throw	22 Aug
Gold	Denys Kushnirov	Shooting	10m Air Pistol Men Junior	24 Aug
Silver	Iryna Romoldanova	Taekwondo	Women's 44kg	15 Aug
Silver	Olexandr Lytvynov	Wrestling	Men's Greco-Roman 58kg	15 Aug
Silver	Nataliia Kovalova	Rowing	Junior women's Single Sculls	18 Aug
Silver	Oleg Stepko	Gymnastics	Men's individual all-around final	18 Aug
Silver	Daryna Zevina	Swimming	Youth women's 50m backstroke	19 Aug
Silver	Oleg Stepko	Gymnastics	Men's floor exercise	21 Aug
Silver	Anatolii Melnyk	Canoeing	C1 Head to head Canoe sprint Men	22 Aug
Silver	Oleksandr Bondar	Diving	Youth men's 3m Springboard	22 Aug
Silver	Oleksandr Bondar	Diving	Youth men's 10m Platform	24 Aug
Bronze	Karyna Stankova	Wrestling	Women's freestyle 70kg	16 Aug
Bronze	Daryna Zevina	Swimming	Youth women's 200m backstroke	17 Aug
Bronze	Kostyantyn Reva	Weightlifting	Men's 85kg	18 Aug
Bronze	Maksim Dominishin	Taekwondo	Men's 73kg	18 Aug
Bronze	Anastasiya Spas	Modern pentathlon	Girls' individual	21 Aug
Bronze	Viktor Chernysh	Athletics	Boys' high jump	21 Aug
Bronze	Ganna Shelekh	Athletics	Girls' pole vault	21 Aug
Bronze	Dmytro Atanov	Judo	Boys' −55kg	21 Aug
Bronze	Serhiy Kulish	Shooting	10m Air Rifle Men Junior	22 Aug
Bronze	Ganna Aleksandrova	Athletics	Girls' Triple jump	23 Aug
Bronze	Olena Kolesnychenko	Athletics	Girls' 400m hurdles	23 Aug
Bronze	Oksana Raita	Athletics	Girls' 2000m Steeplechase	23 Aug
Bronze	Viktoriya Potyekhina	Diving	Youth women's 3m Springboard	23 Aug
Bronze	Kseniya Darchuk	Judo	Girls' −78kg	23 Aug
Bronze	Anatolii Melnyk	Canoeing	C1 slalom Men	25 Aug

Mixed-NOCs events

Medal	Name	Sport	Event	Date
Gold	Anastasiya Spas	Modern Pentathlon	Mixed relay	24 Aug
Bronze	Kseniya Darchuk	Judo	Mixed team	25 Aug

== Competitors ==
The following is the list of number of competitors participating at the Games per sport.

Sport	Men	Women	Total
Archery	1	1	2
Athletics	8	7	15
Badminton	—	1	1
Boxing	2	—	2
Canoeing	2	1	3
Diving	1	1	2
Fencing	1	1	2
Gymnastics	2	3	5
Judo	1	1	2
Modern pentathlon	1	1	2
Rowing	1	1	2
Sailing	1	1	2
Shooting	2	—	2
Swimming	2	1	3
Taekwondo	1	1	2
Tennis	—	2	2
Triathlon	1	—	1
Weightlifting	1	1	2
Wrestling	2	1	3
Total	30	25	55

== Archery ==
Boys

Athlete	Event	Ranking round		Round of 32	Round of 16	Quarterfinals	Semifinals	Final	
Athlete	Event	Score	Seed	Opposition Score	Opposition Score	Opposition Score	Opposition Score	Opposition Score	Rank
Vitaliy Komonyuk	Boys’ individual	610	18	Muller (SUI); L 2–6	Did not advance				17

Girls

Athlete	Event	Ranking round		Round of 32	Round of 16	Quarterfinals	Semifinals	Final	
Athlete	Event	Score	Seed	Opposition Score	Opposition Score	Opposition Score	Opposition Score	Opposition Score	Rank
Lidiia Sichenikova	Girls’ individual	627	7	Paraskevopoulou (GRE); W 6–0	Song (CHN); L 3–7	Did not advance			9

Mixed team

Athlete	Event	Partner	Round of 32	Round of 16	Quarterfinals	Semifinals	Final	
Athlete	Event	Partner	Opposition Score	Opposition Score	Opposition Score	Opposition Score	Opposition Score	Rank
Vitaliy Komonyuk	Mixed team	Erwina Safitri (INA)	Kamel (EGY)/ Oever (NED); L 5–6	Did not advance				17
Lidiia Sichenikova	Mixed team	Ben Chu (USA)	Bozic (SLO)/ Nott (AUS); L 5–6	Did not advance				17

== Athletics ==
=== Boys ===
Track and Road Events

Athletes	Event	Qualification		Final	
Athletes	Event	Result	Rank	Result	Rank
Vyacheslav Shvydkyy	Boys’ 110m hurdles	14.36	11 qB	13.93	10
Igor Lyashchenko	Boys’ 10km walk			42:43.93	Gold medal

Field Events

Athletes	Event	Qualification		Final	
Athletes	Event	Result	Rank	Result	Rank
Dmytro Ostrovskyy	Boys’ shot put	17.71	13 qB	17.47	14
Yuriy Kushniruk	Boys’ javelin throw	68.77	10 qB	70.94	10
Sergiy Regeda	Boys’ hammer throw	66.02	11 qB	NM	
Vadym Adamchuk	Boys’ long jump	7.02	11 qB	7.12	9
Yevgen Strokan	Boys’ Triple Jump	15.92	2 Q	15.71	4
Viktor Chernysh	Boys’ high jump	2.10	1 Q	2.17	Bronze medal

=== Girls ===
Track and Road Events

Athletes	Event	Qualification		Final	
Athletes	Event	Result	Rank	Result	Rank
Anastasiya Tkachuk	Girls’ 1000m	2:43.55	1 Q	2:45.96	4
Olena Kolesnychenko	Girls’ 400m hurdles	59.58	4 Q	59.25	Bronze medal
Oksana Raita	Girls’ 2000m Steeplechase	6:52.36	3 Q	6:41.49	Bronze medal
Alina Galchenko	Girls’ 5km walk			22:47.89	6

Field Events

Athletes	Event	Qualification		Final	
Athletes	Event	Result	Rank	Result	Rank
Kateryna Derun	Girls’ javelin throw	48.32	6 Q	54.59	Gold medal
Ganna Aleksandrova	Girls’ Triple Jump	12.49	3 Q	12.64	Bronze medal
Ganna Shelekh	Girls’ pole vault	3.90	1 Q	4.20	Bronze medal

== Badminton ==
Girls

Athlete	Event	Group Stage				Knock-Out Stage			
Athlete	Event	Match 1	Match 2	Match 3	Rank	Quarterfinal	Semifinal	Final	Rank
Yelyzaveta Zharka	Girls’ singles	Fukuman (JPN) L 0–2 (8–21, 8–21)	Vu (VIE) L 0–2 (16–21, 14–21)	Choi (KOR) L 0–2 (6–21, 11–21)	4	Did not advance			

== Boxing ==
Boys

Athlete	Event	Preliminaries	Semifinals	Final	Rank
Oleg Nekliudov	Light Welterweight (64kg)		Ričardas Kuncaitis (LTU); L 4–5	3rd Place Bout; Fabián Maidana (ARG); L wd	4
Oleksandr Skoryi	super Heavyweight (+91kg)	Tony Yoka (FRA); L RSC R2 2:58	Did not advance	5th Place Bout; Alexios Zarntiasvili (GRE); W w/o	5

== Canoeing ==
Boys

Athlete	Event	Time Trial		Round 1	Round 2 (Rep)	Round 3	Round 4	Round 5	Final	Rank
Athlete	Event	Time	Rank	Round 1	Round 2 (Rep)	Round 3	Round 4	Round 5	Final	Rank
Anatolii Melnyk	Boys’ C1 slalom	1:47.62	4	Cardenas (CUB); W 1:48.41-1:56.59		Liferi (ROU); W 1:45.61-1:56.69	Kutsev (AZE); W 1:48.36-1:59.31	Wang (CHN); L 1:53.81-1:36.60	Daniels (CAN); W 1:44.36-1:46.77	Bronze medal
Anatolii Melnyk	Boys’ C1 sprint	1:44.89	4	Babayan (ARM); W 1:46.61-2:22.00		Burisa (CRO); W 1:45.84-2:01.89	Tiganu (MDA); W 1:50.25-1:50.57	Castaneda (MEX); W 1:51.11-1:51.20	Cardenas (CUB); L 1:51.17-1:48.37	Silver medal
Vasyl Zelnychenko	Boys’ K1 slalom	1:36.28	8	Kalashnikov (RUS); W 1:38.25-1:47.38		Garcia (ESP); W 1:36.90-1:43.32	Prskavec (CZE); L 1:39.04-1:29.19	Did not advance		
Vasyl Zelnychenko	Boys’ K1 sprint	1:33.31	7	Stowman (RSA); W 1:32.91-1:39.46		Sutkus (LTU); W 1:35.63-DNF	Totka (HUN); L 1:34.05-1:32.18	Did not advance		

Girls

Athlete	Event	Time Trial		Round 1	Round 2 (Rep)	Round 3	Round 4	Round 5	Final
Athlete	Event	Time	Rank	Round 1	Round 2 (Rep)	Round 3	Round 4	Round 5	Final
Mariya Kichasova	Girls’ K1 slalom	1:53.59	11	Pedroso (POR); W 1:48.71-1:53.90		Denhollander (CAN); L 1:48.55-1:42.85	Did not advance		
Mariya Kichasova	Girls’ K1 sprint	1:46.77	9	Villumsen (DEN); W 1:46.75-1:48.65		Peters (BEL); L 1:46.00-1:43.27	Did not advance		

== Diving ==
Boys

Athlete	Event	Preliminary		Final	
Athlete	Event	Points	Rank	Points	Rank
Oleksandr Bondar	Boys’ 3m Springboard	556.65	2 Q	565.35	Silver medal
Oleksandr Bondar	Boys’ 10m Platform	563.55	2 Q	605.55	Silver medal

Girls

Athlete	Event	Preliminary		Final	
Athlete	Event	Points	Rank	Points	Rank
Viktoriya Potyekhina	Girls’ 3m Springboard	388.55	5 Q	433.55	Bronze medal
Viktoriya Potyekhina	Girls’ 10m Platform	383.20	6 Q	385.95	6

== Fencing ==
Group Stage

Athlete	Event	Match 1	Match 2	Match 3	Match 4	Match 5	Match 6	Seed
Roman Svichkar	Boys’ épée	Zhakupov (KAZ); L 2–5	Fichera (ITA); W 5–4	Kruk (POL); L 2–5	Melaragno (BRA); L 4–5	Saleh (EGY); L 2–5		11
Alina Komashchuk	Girls’ sabre	Merza (USA); W 5–4	Wan (CHN); W 5–3	Nyabileke (COD); W 5–2	Musch (GER); L 0–5	Hilwiyah (IRQ); W 5–0	Wator (POL); W 5–3	2

Knock-Out Stage

Athlete	Event	Round of 16	Quarterfinals	Semifinals	Final	Rank
Roman Svichkar	Boys’ épée	Zhakupov (KAZ); L 14–15	Did not advance			12
Alina Komashchuk	Girls’ sabre		Boudad (FRA); W 15–10	Egoryan (RUS); L 14–15	Musch (GER); L 13–15	4
Europe 3 Alina Komashchuk (UKR); Tomasz Kruk (POL); Dora Lupkovics (HUN); Mikhail Akula (BLR); Yulia Bakhareva (RUS); Kirill Lichagin (RUS)	Mixed team		Americas 1 L 28–30	5th–8th Americas 2 W 30–23	5th–6th Europe 4 L 29–30	6

== Gymnastics ==
=== Artistic gymnastics ===
Boys

Athlete	Event	Floor		Pommel horse		Rings		Vault		Parallel bars		Horizontal bar		Total	
Athlete	Event	Score	Rank	Score	Rank	Score	Rank	Score	Rank	Score	Rank	Score	Rank	Score	Rank
Oleg Stepko	Boys' qualification	14.400	3 Q	14.550	1 Q	14.050	5 Q	15.700	6 Q	14.300	3 Q	13.800	9	86.800	3 Q
Oleg Stepko	Boys' individual all-around	14.150	3	13.300	8	14.000	4	15.550	6	14.450	2	13.900	4	85.350	Silver medal

Athlete	Event	Score	Rank
Oleg Stepko	Boys' floor	14.500	Silver medal
Oleg Stepko	Boys' pommel horse	13.950	Gold medal
Oleg Stepko	Boys' rings	13.975	4
Oleg Stepko	Boys' vault	14.425	8
Oleg Stepko	Boys' parallel bars	14.400	Gold medal

Girls

Athlete	Event	vault		uneven bars		Beam		Floor		Total	
Athlete	Event	Score	Rank	Score	Rank	Score	Rank	Score	Rank	Score	Rank
Alina Kravchenko	Girls' qualification	13.100	25	12.650	13	13.500	10 Q	12.150	23	51.400	12 Q
Alina Kravchenko	Girls' individual all-around	13.250	16	11.700	15	11.950	17	11.250	18	48.150	17

Athlete	Event	Score	Rank
Alina Kravchenko	Girls' balance beam	12.800	6

=== Rhythmic gymnastics ===
Individual

Athlete	Event	Qualification						Final					
Athlete	Event	Rope	Hoop	Ball	Clubs	Total	Rank	Rope	Hoop	Ball	Clubs	Total	Rank
Viktoriia Shynkarenko	Girls' individual all-around	23.725	23.425	22.825	22.400	92.375	7 Q	23.175	22.325	22.050	23.450	91.000	8

=== Trampoline ===
Athlete	Event	Qualification				Final	
Athlete	Event	Routine 1	Routine 2	Total	Rank	Routine 1	Rank
Oleksandr Satin	Boys' trampoline	28.100	40.200	68.300	2 Q	41.000	Gold medal
Diana Klyuchnyk	Girls' trampoline	22.900	34.100	57.000	9	Did not advance	

== Judo ==
Individual

Athlete	Event	Round 1	Round 2	Round 3	Semifinals	Final	Rank
Athlete	Event	Opposition Result	Opposition Result	Opposition Result	Opposition Result	Opposition Result	Rank
Dmytro Antanov	Boys' −55 kg	BYE	Pulkrabek (CZE); L 001–020		Repechage; Basile (ITA); W 001–000	Bronze Medal Match; Subash (IND); W 100–000	
Kseniya Darchuk	Girls' −78 kg	BYE	Calderon (GUA); W 010–000		Kubin (GER); L 000–101	Bronze Medal Match; Tuba (SRB); W 100–001	

Team

Team	Event	Round 1	Round 2	Semifinals	Final	Rank
Team	Event	Opposition Result	Opposition Result	Opposition Result	Opposition Result	Rank
New York; Katelyn Bouyssou (USA); Dmytro Atanov (UKR); Julanda Bacaj (ALB); Matheus Marcia Machado (BRA); Dilara Incedayi (TUR); Ghenadie Pretivatii (MDA); Milica Savic (BIH); Mateja Glusac (SRB)	Mixed team	BYE	Tokyo; L 4–4 (2–3)	Did not advance		5
Tokyo; Seul Bi Bae (KOR); Fabio Basile (ITA); Gaelle Nemorin (MRI); Patrik Ferreira Martins (AND); Rotem Shor (ISR); Kevin Fernandez (HON); Kseniya Darchuk (UKR); Batuhan Efemgil (TUR)	Mixed team	Paris; W 5–3	New York; W 4–4 (3–2)	Belgrade; L 3–5	Did not advance	Bronze medal

== Modern pentathlon ==
Athlete	Event	Fencing (épée One Touch)			Swimming (200m freestyle)			Running & Shooting (3000m, Laser Pistol)			Total Points	Final Rank
Athlete	Event	Results	Rank	Points	Time	Rank	Points	Time	Rank	Points	Total Points	Final Rank
Yuriy Fedechko	Boys' individual	12–11	7	840	2:08.19	8	1264	11:38.74	14	2208	4312	12
Anastasiya Spas	Girls' individual	16–7	3	1000	2:20.62	4	1116	12:43.95	6	1948	4064	Bronze medal
Valerie Lim (SIN); Yuriy Fedechko (UKR)	Mixed relay	36–56	21	720	2:04.24	8	1312	15:13.54	2	2428	4460	7
Anasyasiya Spas (UKR); Ilya Shugarov (RUS)	Mixed relay	63–29	1	990	2:02.25	4	1336	15:42.32	9	2312	4638	Gold medal

== Rowing ==
Athlete	Event	Heats		Repechage		Semifinals		Final		Overall Rank
Athlete	Event	Time	Rank	Time	Rank	Time	Rank	Time	Rank	Overall Rank
Iurii Ivanov	Boys' single sculls	3:25.07	2 QR	3:33.14	1 QA/B	3:28.11	3 QA	3:27.98	6	6
Nataliia Kovalova	Girls' single sculls	3:48.47	3 QR	3:55.98	1 QA/B	3:53.58	2 QA	3:44.63	2	Silver medal

== Sailing ==
One Person Dinghy

Athlete	Event	Race												Points	Rank
Athlete	Event	1	2	3	4	5	6	7	8	9	10	11	M*	Points	Rank
Pavlo Babych	Boys' Byte CII	~~21~~	13	15	8	10	~~24~~	2	7	1	8	4	4	72	5
Sofiia Larycheva	Girls' Byte CII	18	15	4	17	7	17	17	~~OCS~~	~~19~~	7	7	7	116	14

== Shooting ==
Pistol

Athlete	Event	Qualification		Final		
Athlete	Event	Score	Rank	Score	Total	Rank
Denys Kushnirov	Boys' 10m air pistol	578	1 Q	98.3	676.3	Gold medal

Rifle

Athlete	Event	Qualification		Final		
Athlete	Event	Score	Rank	Score	Total	Rank
Serhiy Kulish	Boys' 10m air rifle	591	3 Q	101.8	692.8	Bronze medal

== Swimming ==
Athletes	Event	Heat		Semifinal		Final	
Athletes	Event	Time	Position	Time	Position	Time	Position
Andrii Govorov	Boys’ 50m freestyle	22.62	1 Q	22.27	1 Q	22.35	Gold medal
Andrii Govorov	Boys’ 100m freestyle	56.15	44	Did not advance			
Andrii Govorov	Boys’ 50m butterfly	23.67	1 Q	23.46	1 Q	23.64	Gold medal
Andrii Kovbasa	Boys’ 50m backstroke			26.48	3 Q	26.58	5
Andrii Kovbasa	Boys’ 100m backstroke	57.96	11 Q	57.35	7 Q	56.93	7
Andrii Kovbasa	Boys’ 200m backstroke	2:07.11	12			Did not advance	
Daryna Zevina	Girls’ 50m backstroke	29.79	4 Q	29.51	2 Q	29.34	Silver medal
Daryna Zevina	Girls’ 100m backstroke	1:02.55	2 Q	1:02.57	1 Q	1:01.51	Gold medal
Daryna Zevina	Girls’ 200m backstroke	2:15.12	4 Q			2:12.31	Bronze medal

== Taekwondo ==
Athlete	Event	Preliminary	Quarterfinal	Semifinal	Final	Rank
Maksym Dominishyn	Boys' −73kg	BYE	Tahir Gulec (GER); W 12–8	Jin Hak Kim (KOR); L 4–6	Did not advance	Bronze medal
Iryna Romoldanova	Girls' −44kg	Maria Silvia (TLS); W 12–0	Sara Sadeq (BRN); W RSC R1 0:16	Shukrona Sharifova (TJK); W 3–0	Anastasia Valueva (RUS); L 1–7	Silver medal

== Tennis ==
Singles

Athlete	Event	Round 1	Round 2	Quarterfinals	Semifinals	Final	Rank
Elina Svitolina	Girls' singles	Friedsam (GER); W 2–1 (6–2, 4–6, 6–1)	Gavrilova (RUS); L 0–2 (2–6, 3–6)	Did not advance			
Sofiya Kovalets	Girls' singles	Babos (HUN); L 0–2 (1–6, 2–6)	Consolation; Radulovic (MNE); L 0–2 (wd)	Did not advance			

Doubles

Athlete	Event	Round 1	Quarterfinals	Semifinals	Final	Rank
Sofiya Kovalets (UKR); Elina Svitolina (UKR)	Girls' doubles	Royg (PAR); Eskenazi (ARG); W 2–1 (6–2, 4–6, [10–5])	Gavrilova (RUS); Putintseva (RUS); L 0–2 (4–6, 4–6)	Did not advance		

== Triathlon ==
Men's

Athlete	Event	Swim (1.5 km)	Trans 1	Bike (40 km)	Trans 2	Run (10 km)	Total	Rank
Andriy Sirenko	Individual	9:04	0:29	29:39	0:24	18:09	57:45.67	19

Mixed

Athlete	Event	Total times per athlete (wwim 250 m, bike 7 km, run 1.7 km)	Total group time	Rank
Charlotte Deldaele (BEL); Andriy Sirenko (UKR); Raquel Mafra Rocha (POR); Diego Paz (ESP)	Mixed team relay Europe 5	20:48; 19:26; 23:05; 20:30	1:23:49.96	10

== Weightlifting ==
Athlete	Event	Snatch	Clean & jerk	Total	Rank
Kostyantyn Reva	Boys' 85kg	145	175	320	Bronze medal
Tetyana Syrota	Girls' +63kg	89	113	202	7

== Wrestling ==
Freestyle

Athlete	Event	Pools		Final	Rank
Athlete	Event	Groups	Rank	Final	Rank
Karyna Stankova	Girls' 70kg	Nemeth (HUN); W Fall (3–0)	2	3rd Place Match; Kushkenova (KAZ); W 2–0 (8–0, 5–1)	Bronze medal
Karyna Stankova	Girls' 70kg	Kuenz (AUT); W 2–0 (1–0, 3–0)	2	3rd Place Match; Kushkenova (KAZ); W 2–0 (8–0, 5–1)	Bronze medal
Karyna Stankova	Girls' 70kg	Yeats (CAN); L 0–2 (1–3, 0–1)	2	3rd Place Match; Kushkenova (KAZ); W 2–0 (8–0, 5–1)	Bronze medal

Greco-Roman

Athlete	Event	Pools		Final	Rank
Athlete	Event	Groups	Rank	Final	Rank
Oleksiy Zhabskyy	Boys' 42kg	Bazarov (AZE); L 0–2 (0–7, 0–4)	2	3rd Place Match; Baimaganbetov (KAZ); L 0–2 (0–2, 1–7)	4
Oleksiy Zhabskyy	Boys' 42kg	Pilay (ECU); W Fall (7–1, 3–1)	2	3rd Place Match; Baimaganbetov (KAZ); L 0–2 (0–2, 1–7)	4
Olexandr Lytvynov	Boys' 58kg	Suleymanov (RUS); W 2–1 (0–7, 1–0, 1–0)	1	Amatov (MGL); L Fall (0–2, 0–5)	Silver medal
Olexandr Lytvynov	Boys' 58kg	Gregory (RSA); W 2–1 (2–0, 3–4, 2–1)	1	Amatov (MGL); L Fall (0–2, 0–5)	Silver medal
Olexandr Lytvynov	Boys' 58kg	Camarillo (MEX); W 2–1 (0–2, 1+–1, 1+-1)	1	Amatov (MGL); L Fall (0–2, 0–5)	Silver medal
