= Gymnastics at the 2010 Summer Youth Olympics – Men's floor =

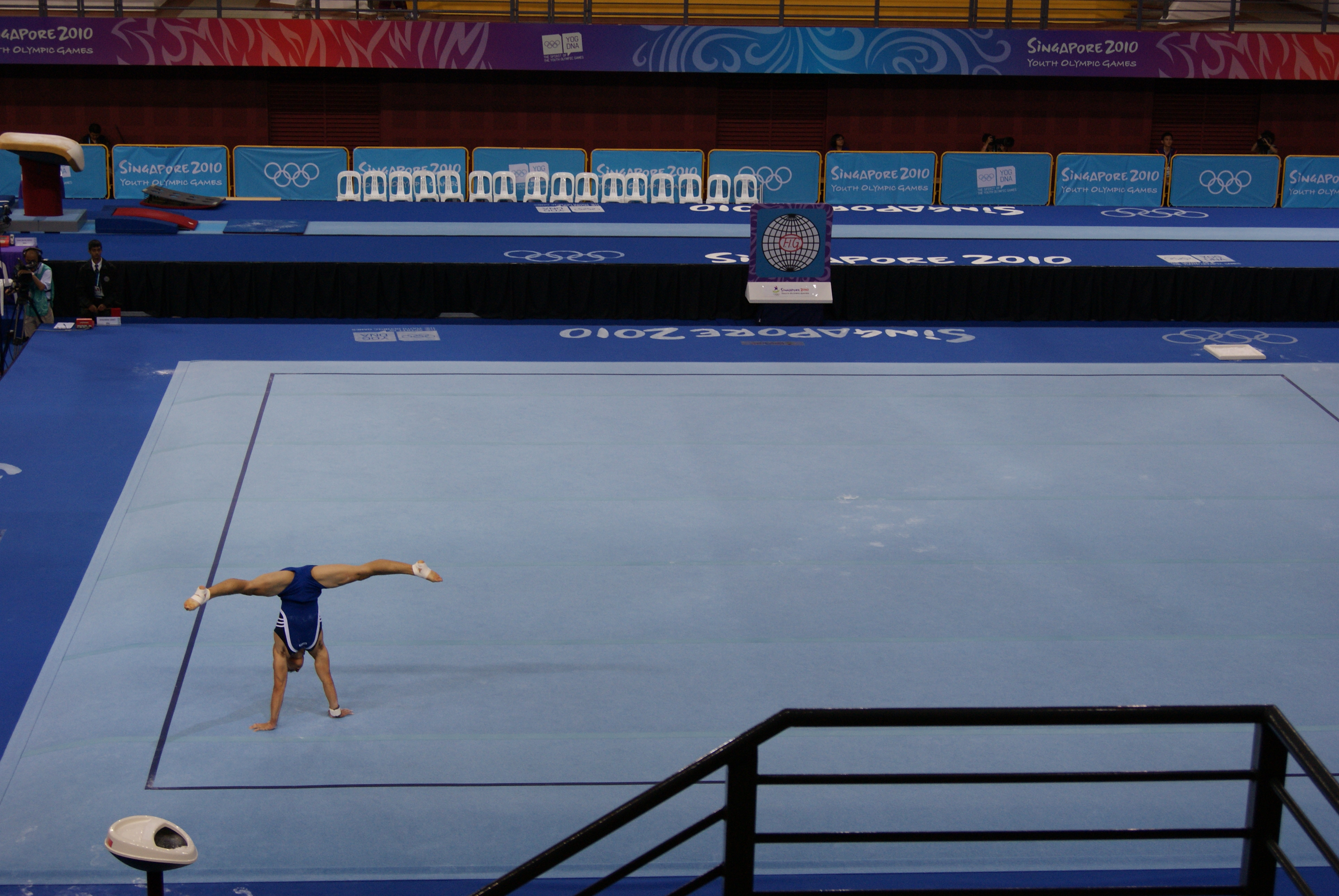
A gymnast competing in the floor exercise competition during the 2010 Summer Youth Olympics

These are the results of the men's floor exercise competition, one of seven events for male competitors of the artistic gymnastics discipline contested in the gymnastics at the 2010 Summer Youth Olympics in Singapore. The qualification and final rounds took place on 16 August at the Bishan Sports Hall.

== Medalists ==
Gold	Silver	Bronze
Ernesto Vila Sarria; Cuba	Oleg Stepko; Ukraine	Zhu Xiaodong; China

== Results ==
=== Qualification ===
41 gymnasts competed in the floor exercise event in the artistic gymnastics qualification round on August 16. The eight highest scoring gymnasts advanced to the final on August 21.

=== Final ===
Rank	Gymnast	A-score	B-score	Penalty	Total
Gold medal	Ernesto Vila Sarria (CUB)	5.4	9.175	—	14.575
Silver medal	Oleg Stepko (UKR)	5.4	9.100	—	14.500
Bronze medal	Zhu Xiaodong (CHN)	5.3	9.000	—	14.300
4	Thomas Neuteleers (BEL)	5.0	8.850	—	13.850
5	Sam Oldham (GBR)	5.3	8.775	0.3	13.775
6	Filip Borosa (CRO)	4.9	8.700	—	13.600
7	Néstor Abad (ESP)	5.1	8.750	0.3	13.550
8	Yuya Kamoto (JPN)	4.9	8.150	—	13.050
