= Egypt at the 2010 Summer Youth Olympics =

- IOC code: EGY
- NOC: Egyptian Olympic Committee
- Website: http://www.egyptianolympic.org/

in Singapore 14 – 26 August 2010
- Competitors: 74 in 17 sports
- Flag bearer: Jihan El Midany
- Medals Ranked 24th: Gold 2 Silver 2 Bronze 2 Total 6

Summer Youth Olympics appearances (overview)
- 2010; 2014; 2018; 2026

Egypt participated in the 2010 Summer Youth Olympics in Singapore.

Jihan El Midany was the first woman flagbearer for Egypt at any Olympic event.

== Medalists ==
Medals awarded to participants of mixed-NOC (combined) teams are represented in italics. These medals are not counted towards the individual NOC medal tally.

Medal	Name	Sport	Event	Date
Gold	Ibrahim Sabry	Archery	Junior Men's Individual	21 Aug
Gold	Egypt National Handball Team: Karim Abdelrhim; Aly Agamy; Abdelrahman Aly; Mohammed Maher; Mohamed Aly; Mostafa Awadalla; Mostafa Bechir; Omar Elmaarry; Kareem Elmenshawy; Mustafa Khalil; Ahmed Alwan; Ahmed Ibrahim; Alley Mohsen; Abdelrahman Shatta	Handball	Boys' tournament	25 Aug.
Silver	Hamdy Abdelwahab	Wrestling	Men's Greco-Roman 85kg	15 Aug
Silver	Aicha Niazi; Manar Elgarf; Jacinthe Eldeeb; Farida Eid	Gymnastics	All-Around Group Rhythmic Gymnastics	25 Aug
Bronze	Hassan Mohamed	Weightlifting	Men's +85 kg	19 Aug
Bronze	Mohamed Abdalla	Equestrian	Team Jumping	20 Aug
Bronze	Hesham Abdelaal	Boxing	Men's Fly 51kg	24 Aug

== Archery ==
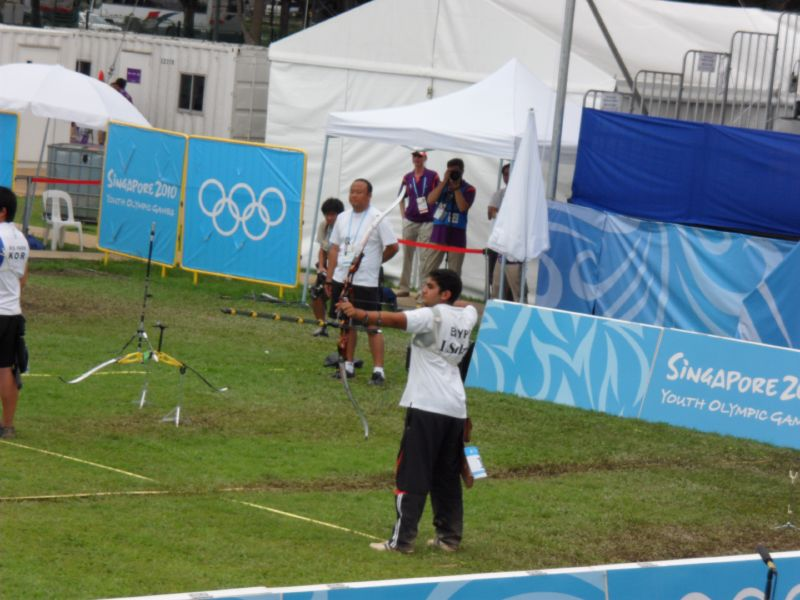
Ibrahim Sabry at the Junior Men's Individual archery competition taking place on 21 August 2010 at Kallang Field, Singapore. Ibrahim eventually won the event.

Boys

Athlete	Events	Ranking Round		Round of 32	Round of 16	Quarterfinals	Semifinals	Final	
Athlete	Events	Score	Seed	Opposition Score	Opposition Score	Opposition Score	Opposition Score	Opposition Score	Rank
Ibrahim Sabry	Individual	631	10	Karoukin (BLR); W 6-5	Todorov (BUL); W 6-0	Beom (KOR); W 7-3	Rajh (SLO); W 6-2	Oever (NED); W 6-0	Gold medal

Girls

Athlete	Events	Ranking Round		Round of 32	Round of 16	Quarterfinals	Semifinals	Final	
Athlete	Events	Score	Seed	Opposition Score	Opposition Score	Opposition Score	Opposition Score	Opposition Score	Rank
Aya Kamel	Individual	492	31	Tan (TPE); L 0-6	Did not advance				17

Mixed Team

Athlete	Event	Partner	Round of 32	Round of 16	Quarterfinals	Semifinals	Final	
Athlete	Event	Partner	Opposition Score	Opposition Score	Opposition Score	Opposition Score	Opposition Score	Rank
Ibrahim Sabry	Mixed Team	Yasaman Shirian (IRI)	Mirca (MDA)/ Ipsen (DEN); L 5-6	Did not advance				17
Aya Kamel	Mixed Team	Rick van den Oever (NED)	Safitri (INA)/ Komonyuk (UKR); W 6-5	Ingley (AUS)/ Koiwa (JPN); L 3-7	Did not advance			9

== Athletics ==
=== Boys ===
Track and road events

Athletes	Event	Qualification		Final	
Athletes	Event	Result	Rank	Result	Rank
Ahmed Mansour	Boys' 1000m	2:25.55	11 Q	2:24.22	6
Salem Attiatalla	Boys' 2000m Steeplechase	6:03.41	7 Q	5:49.03	7

Field events

Athletes	Event	Qualification		Final	
Athletes	Event	Result	Rank	Result	Rank
Fadl Ibrahim	Boys' Javelin Throw	70.89	7 Q	70.89	7
Eslam Ibrahim	Boys' Hammer Throw	73.42	1 Q	63.75	6

=== Girls ===
Field events

Event	Athletes	Qualification		Final	
Event	Athletes	Result	Rank	Result	Rank
Basant Ibrahim	Girls' High Jump	1.73	8 Q	1.70	8
Noha Afifi	Girls' Javelin throw	38.35	14 qB	38.92	14
Ashrakt Metwaly	Girls' Hammer throw	45.77	16 qB	DNS	

== Badminton ==
Boys

Athlete	Event	Group Stage				Knock-Out Stage			
Athlete	Event	Match 1	Match 2	Match 3	Rank	Quarterfinal	Semifinal	Final	Rank
Mahmoud Elsayad	Boys' Singles	Yuxiang (CHN) L 0-2 (9-21, 13-21)	Belarbi (ALG) W 2-0 (21-16, 22-20)	Fransman (NED) W 2-0 (21-16, 21-19)	2	Did not advance			

== Basketball ==
Boys

Squad List	Event	Group Stage		Placement Stage			Rank
Squad List	Event	Group B	Rank	9th-16th	13th-16th	13th-14th	Rank
Khaled Ibrahim; Assem Elgindy; Ahmed Karkoura (C); Romeh Elsadani	Boys' Basketball	Iran; L 21-27	3	Puerto Rico; L 16-29	Virgin Islands; W 28-26	New Zealand; W 29-26	13
Khaled Ibrahim; Assem Elgindy; Ahmed Karkoura (C); Romeh Elsadani	Boys' Basketball	Lithuania; W 33-31	3	Puerto Rico; L 16-29	Virgin Islands; W 28-26	New Zealand; W 29-26	13
Khaled Ibrahim; Assem Elgindy; Ahmed Karkoura (C); Romeh Elsadani	Boys' Basketball	Argentina; L 24-30	3	Puerto Rico; L 16-29	Virgin Islands; W 28-26	New Zealand; W 29-26	13
Khaled Ibrahim; Assem Elgindy; Ahmed Karkoura (C); Romeh Elsadani	Boys' Basketball	Panama; W 30-7	3	Puerto Rico; L 16-29	Virgin Islands; W 28-26	New Zealand; W 29-26	13

== Boxing ==
Athlete	Event	Preliminaries	Semifinals	Final	Rank
Hesham Abdelaal	Flyweight (51 kg)	Shaban Shahpalangov (AZE); W 8-4	Emmanuel Rodriguez (PUR); L 1-10	3rd Place Bout; Kandel Dowden (GRN); W DSQ R2 2:35	Bronze medal

== Equestrian ==
Athlete	Horse	Event	Round 1			Round 2			Total	Jump-Off		Rank
Athlete	Horse	Event	Penalties		Rank	Penalties		Rank	Total	Penalties	Time	Rank
Athlete	Horse	Event	Jump	Time	Rank	Jump	Time	Rank	Total	Penalties	Time	Rank
Mohamed Abdalla	Buzzword	Individual Jumping	0	0	1	8	0	19	8			9
Yara Hanssen (ZIM); Zakaria Hamici (ALG); Abduladim Mlitan (LBA); Mohamed Abdalla (EGY); Samantha McIntosh (RSA)	AP Akermanis; APH Mr Sheen; Belcam Hinnerk; Buzzword; Little Miss Sunshine	Team Jumping	~~12~~; ~~12~~; 4; 0; 0	~~0~~; ~~0~~; 0; 0; 0	1	~~16~~; ~~8~~; 0; 4; 0	~~0~~; ~~1~~; 0; 0; 0	2	8	~~9~~; 8; 8; 8; ~~DNS~~	~~1:03.57~~; 47.48; 55.59; 54.39; ~~DNS~~	Bronze medal

== Fencing ==
Group Stage

Athlete	Event	Match 1	Match 2	Match 3	Match 4	Match 5	Match 6	Seed
Saleh Saleh	Boys' Épée	Svichkar (UKR); W 5-2	Zhakupov (KAZ); L 1-5	Fichera (ITA); L 0-5	Kruk (POL); W 5-3	Melaragno (BRA); W 5-4		8
Mostafa Mahmoud	Boys' Foil	Lichagin (RUS); L 3-5	Gyorgyi (HUN); W 5-2	Tofalides (GBR); W 5-2	Lee (KOR); L 1-5	Luperi (ITA); L 2-5		9
Ziad Elsissy	Boys' Sabre	Hubers (GER); L 1-5	Zatko (FRA); L 2-5	Sirbu (ROU); W 5-2	Akula (BLR); L 1-5	Wang (HKG); L 2-5	Kondo (NIG); W 5-1	11
Menatalla Daw	Girls' Foil	Jaoude (LIB); W 5-1	Goldie (CAN); L 0-5	Alekseeva (RUS); L 0-5	Shaito (USA); L 1-5	Ndao (SEN); W 5-2	Mancini (ITA); L 0-5	9
Mennatalla Yasser Ahmed	Girls' Sabre	Seo (KOR); L 3-5	Ciardullo (ITA); W 5-0	Boudad (FRA); L 3-5	Egoryan (RUS); L 0-5	Carreno (VEN); W 5-4		8

Knock-Out Stage

Athlete	Event	Round of 16	Quarterfinals	Semifinals	Final	Rank
Saleh Saleh	Boys' Épée	Ciovica (ROU); L 5-15	Did not advance			10
Mostafa Mahmoud	Boys' Foil	Tofalides (GBR); L 9-15	Did not advance			10
Ziad Elsissy	Boys' Sabre	Spear (USA); L 10-15	Did not advance			12
Menatalla Daw	Girls' Foil	Wang (CHN); L 4-15	Did not advance			9
Mennatalla Yasser Ahmed	Girls' Sabre	Ciardullo (ITA); W 15-6	Merza (USA); L 4-15	Did not advance		8
Africa; Mennatalla Yasser Ahmed (EGY); Saleh Saleh (EGY); Menatalla Daw (EGY); Ziad Elsissy (EGY); Wanda Matshaya (RSA); Mostafa Mahmoud (EGY)	Mixed Team	Americas 2 L 25-28	Did not advance			9

== Gymnastics ==
=== Artistic gymnastics ===
Boys'

Athlete	Event	Qualification								Final							
Athlete	Event	Floor	Pommel Horse	Rings	Vault	Parallel Bars	Horizontal Bar	Total	Rank	Floor	Pommel Horse	Rings	Vault	Parallel Bars	Horizontal Bar	Total	Rank
Amr Ahmed	Individual all-around	13.350	13.600	13.150	14.900	12.750	13.300	81.050	18	12.850	13.450	12.750	14.700	13.650	13.500	80.900	14

Girls'

Athlete	Event	Qualification						Final					
Athlete	Event	Vault	Uneven Bars	Balance Beam	Floor Exercise	Total	Rank	Vault	Uneven Bars	Balance Beam	Floor Exercise	Total	Rank
Mai Elsayed	Individual all-around	12.250	10.400	11.350	11.000	45.000	35	Did not advance					

=== Rhythmic gymnastics ===
Individual

Athlete	Event	Qualification						Final					
Athlete	Event	Rope	Hoop	Ball	Clubs	Total	Rank	Rope	Hoop	Ball	Clubs	Total	Rank
Alia Elkatib	Girls' Individual All-Around	20.675	21.875	22.050	21.350	85.950	12	Did not advance					

Group

Athlete	Event	Qualification				Final			
Athlete	Event	4 Hoop	4 Ribbon	Total	Rank	4 Hoop	4 Ribbon	Total	Rank
Aicha Niazi; Manar Elgarf; Jacinthe Eldeeb; Farida Eid	Team	22.375; Rank (3)	19.275; Rank (5)	41.650	3 Q	23.000; Rank (2)	22.275; Rank (2)	45.275	Silver medal

== Handball ==
Egypt Squad list	Preliminary		Semifinal	Final	Rank
Egypt Squad list	Group B	Rank	Semifinal	Final	Rank
Karim Abdelrhim; Aly Agamy; Abdelrahman Aly; Mohammed Maher; Mohamed Aly; Mostafa Awadalla; Mostafa Bechir; Omar El Maarry; Kareem Elmenshawy; Mustafa Khalil; Ahmed Alwan; Ahmed Ibrahim; Alley Mohsen; Abdelrahman Shatta	Singapore W 50 – 7 (21–2)	2	France; W 22 - 21 (12 - 11)	South Korea; W 35 - 25 ( 13 - 13 )	Gold medal
Karim Abdelrhim; Aly Agamy; Abdelrahman Aly; Mohammed Maher; Mohamed Aly; Mostafa Awadalla; Mostafa Bechir; Omar El Maarry; Kareem Elmenshawy; Mustafa Khalil; Ahmed Alwan; Ahmed Ibrahim; Alley Mohsen; Abdelrahman Shatta	Brazil; D 13 - 13 (18 - 17)	2	France; W 22 - 21 (12 - 11)	South Korea; W 35 - 25 ( 13 - 13 )	Gold medal

August 20, 2010; 20:15	Singapore	7 – 50	Egypt	Suntec Hall 602; Referees: Hizaki, Ikebuchi (Japan)
August 20, 2010; 20:15	Koh 3	(2–21)	Abdelrhim 10	Suntec Hall 602; Referees: Hizaki, Ikebuchi (Japan)
August 20, 2010; 20:15	3× (yellow card) 3× (suspension)	Report	3× (yellow card) 1× (suspension)	Suntec Hall 602; Referees: Hizaki, Ikebuchi (Japan)

August 22, 2010; 20:15	Egypt	31 – 31	Brazil	Suntec Hall 602; Referees: Bonaventura, Bonaventura (France)
August 22, 2010; 20:15	Abdelrhim 9	(18–17)	Dutra 10	Suntec Hall 602; Referees: Bonaventura, Bonaventura (France)
August 22, 2010; 20:15	1× (yellow card) 5× (suspension) 1× (red card)	Report	3× (yellow card) 3× (suspension)	Suntec Hall 602; Referees: Bonaventura, Bonaventura (France)

August 24, 2010; 18:00	France	21 – 22	Egypt	Suntec Hall 602; Referees: da Costa, da Costa (Brazil)
August 24, 2010; 18:00	Descat 6	(11-12)	Bechir 5	Suntec Hall 602; Referees: da Costa, da Costa (Brazil)
August 24, 2010; 18:00	3× (yellow card) 5× (suspension)	Report	4× (yellow card) 3× (suspension) 1× (red card)	Suntec Hall 602; Referees: da Costa, da Costa (Brazil)

August 25, 2010; 20:00	Egypt	35 – 25	South Korea	Suntec Hall 602; Referees: Bonaventura, Bonaventura (France)
August 25, 2010; 20:00	Mohsen 15	(13-13)	Lee Hyeon Sik 11	Suntec Hall 602; Referees: Bonaventura, Bonaventura (France)
August 25, 2010; 20:00	3× (yellow card) 3× (suspension)	Report	3× (yellow card) 1× (suspension)	Suntec Hall 602; Referees: Bonaventura, Bonaventura (France)

== Modern pentathlon ==
Girls

Athlete	Fencing (Épée One Touch)			Swimming (200m Freestyle)			Shooting & Running (3000m, Laser Pistol)			Total Points	Final Rank
Athlete	Results	Rank	MP Points	Time	Rank	MP Points	Time	Rank	MP Points	Total Points	Final Rank
Jihan El Midany	9W 14L	14	720	2:24.01	9	1072	12:52.33	8	1912	3704	12

Boys

Athlete	Fencing (Épée One Touch)			Swimming (200m Freestyle)			Shooting & Running (3000m, Laser Pistol)			Total Points	Final Rank
Athlete	Results	Rank	MP Points	Time	Rank	MP Points	Time	Rank	MP Points	Total Points	Final Rank
Eslam Hamad	12W 11L	=7	840	2:07.39	7	1272	11:32.30	11	2232	4344	10

Mixed Relay

Athlete	Partner	Fencing (Épée One Touch)			Swimming (200m Freestyle)			Shooting & Running (3000m, Laser Pistol)			Total Points	Final Rank
Athlete	Partner	Results	Rank	MP Points	Time	Rank	MP Points	Time	Rank	MP Points	Total Points	Final Rank
Eslam Hamad	Min Ji Choi (KOR)	44W 48L	15	800	2:00.06	3	1360	16:28.41	15	2128	4288	13
Jihan El Midany	Ilias Baktybekov (KGZ)	46W 46L	11	820	2:07.74	16	1268	16:23.84	14	2148	4236	15

== Shooting ==
Boys

Athlete	Event	Qualification		Final		
Athlete	Event	Score	Rank	Score	Total	Rank
Raef Mahmoud Tawfiq	10m Air Pistol	562	11	Did not advance		
Hossam Emad Salah	10m Air Rifle	579	17	Did not advance		

Girls

Athlete	Event	Qualification		Final		
Athlete	Event	Score	Rank	Score	Total	Rank
Hala Emad Abdulrahman	10m Air Pistol	368	14	Did not advance		
Dina Amjad El Harony	10m Air Rifle	386	16	Did not advance		

== Swimming ==
Athletes	Event	Heat		Semifinal		Final	
Athletes	Event	Time	Position	Time	Position	Time	Position
Amr Mohamed	Boys' 200m Freestyle	1:59.48	38	Did not advance			
Amr Mohamed	Boys' 400m Freestyle	4:10.50	25	Did not advance			
Shahd Mostafa	Girls' 100m Freestyle	1:00.42	37	Did not advance			
Shahd Mostafa	Girls' 200m Freestyle	2:07.33	21	Did not advance			
Shahd Mostafa	Girls' 400m Freestyle	4:27.48	15	Did not advance			

== Table tennis ==
Boys

Athlete	Event	Round of 32				Round of 16				Quarterfinals	Semifinals	Final	
Athlete	Event	Opposition Result	Opposition Result	Opposition Result	Rank	Opposition Result	Opposition Result	Opposition Result	Rank	Opposition Result	Opposition Result	Opposition Result	Rank
Omar Bedair	Men's Singles	Tapia (ECU); W 3-0 (11-8, 11-5, 11-9)	Lakatos (HUN); L 0-3 (11-6, 11-7, 11-10)	Galic (SLO); L 3-2 (11-3, 12-10, 6-11, 8-11, 5-11)	3	Marakkala (SRI); W 3-2 (11-8, 10-12, 8-11, 11-8, 14-12)	Mutti (ITA); W 1-3 (11-6, 4-11, 6-11, 9-11)	Massah (MAW); W 3-0 (11-2, 11-2, 11-3)	1	Did not advance			

Girls

Athlete	Event	Round of 32				Round of 16				Quarterfinals	Semifinals	Final	
Athlete	Event	Opposition Result	Opposition Result	Opposition Result	Rank	Opposition Result	Opposition Result	Opposition Result	Rank	Opposition Result	Opposition Result	Opposition Result	Rank
Dina Meshref	Women's Singles	Phan (AUS); W 3-0 (11-6, 11-7, 11-6)	Jeger (CRO); L 0-3 (12-10, 11-5, 4-11, 13-11)	Galic (SLO); W 3-2 (11-3, 9-11, 11-9, 5-11, 11-7)	2	Tanioka (JPN); L 1-3 (12-10, 10-12, 11-7, 11-4)	Gu (CHN); L 0-3 (11-9, 11-7, 11-5)	Noskova (RUS); L 1-3 (11-8, 11-13, 11-7, 12-10)	4	Did not advance			

Mixed Teams

Athlete	Event	Round of 16				Quarterfinals	Semifinals	Final	
Athlete	Event	Opposition Result	Opposition Result	Opposition Result	Rank	Opposition Result	Opposition Result	Opposition Result	Rank
Dina Meshref; Omar Bedair	Mixed Teams	vs. Africa1; W 2-1	Singapore (SIN); L 0-3	vs. InterContinental2; W 3-0	2	Korea (KOR); L 0-2	Did not advance		

== Taekwondo ==
Women's

Athlete	Event	Preliminary	Quarterfinal	Semifinal	Final	Rank
Nour Hussein Abdelsalam	49kg	Melanie Phan (CAN); L 1 - 7	Did not advance			9

Men's

Athlete	Event	Preliminary	Quarterfinal	Semifinal	Final	Rank
Mohamed Magdy Asal	55kg	Peterson Sertune (HAI); L DSQ	Did not advance			9

== Volleyball ==
Girls

Squad list	Preliminary		Semifinal	Final	Rank
Squad list	Group B	Rank	Semifinal	Final	Rank
Salma Elmohands (C); Renad Wahdan; Aya Abdullah; Menna Atalla Fahmy; Nehal Ahmed; Norhan Sobhi; Farah Ahmed; Shorouk Mahmoud; Bassant Hassan; Yasmin Hussein; Nirmeen Seifelnasr; Ranad Radwan	Belgium; L 0 - 3 (11-25, 12-25, 10-25)	3	Did not advance	5th Place Match; Singapore; W 3 - 1 (20-25, 25-18, 25-19, 25-19)	5
Salma Elmohands (C); Renad Wahdan; Aya Abdullah; Menna Atalla Fahmy; Nehal Ahmed; Norhan Sobhi; Farah Ahmed; Shorouk Mahmoud; Bassant Hassan; Yasmin Hussein; Nirmeen Seifelnasr; Ranad Radwan	United States; L 0 - 3 (18-25, 19-25, 23-25)	3	Did not advance	5th Place Match; Singapore; W 3 - 1 (20-25, 25-18, 25-19, 25-19)	5

August 21, 2010; 15:30	Belgium	3–0	Egypt	Toa Payoh Sports Hall; Attendance: 1,650; Referees: Hao Juan Wang (China), Prasertsak Boonsiriroj (Thailand)
August 21, 2010; 15:30	(25–11, 25–12, 25–10)			Toa Payoh Sports Hall; Attendance: 1,650; Referees: Hao Juan Wang (China), Prasertsak Boonsiriroj (Thailand)

August 23, 2010; 15:30	Egypt	0–3	United States	Toa Payoh Sports Hall; Attendance: 1,200; Referees: Prasertsak Boonsiriroj (Thailand), Lourdes Perez Perez (Cuba)
August 23, 2010; 15:30	(18–25, 19–25, 23–25)			Toa Payoh Sports Hall; Attendance: 1,200; Referees: Prasertsak Boonsiriroj (Thailand), Lourdes Perez Perez (Cuba)

August 25, 2010; 12:30	Egypt	3–1	Singapore	Toa Payoh Sports Hall; Attendance: 1100; Referees: Ibrahim Al-Traifi (Saudi Arabia), Yanick Chaladay (France)
August 25, 2010; 12:30	(20–25, 25–18, 25–19, 25–19)			Toa Payoh Sports Hall; Attendance: 1100; Referees: Ibrahim Al-Traifi (Saudi Arabia), Yanick Chaladay (France)

== Weightlifting ==
Boys

Athlete	Event	Snatch	Clean & Jerk	Total	Rank
Hassan Mohamed	+85kg	150	180	330	Bronze medal
Ossama Khattab	77kg	—	—	DNF	

Girls

Athlete	Event	Snatch	Clean & Jerk	Total	Rank
Amal Mohamed	58kg	81	—	—	

== Wrestling ==
Freestyle

Athlete	Event	Pools		Final	Rank
Athlete	Event	Groups	Rank	Final	Rank
Mohamed Abdelnaeem	Boys' 46kg	Hovhannisyan (ARM); L 0–2 (0–6, 0–1)	3	5th Place Match; Rios (PER); W Fall (5–6)	5
Mohamed Abdelnaeem	Boys' 46kg	Balzhinimaev (RUS); L 0–2 (0–3, 1–2)	3	5th Place Match; Rios (PER); W Fall (5–6)	5
Amr Ali	Boys' 76kg	Rogers (USA); L 1–2 (2+–2, 3–6, 2-2+)	2	3rd Place Match; Ergashev (UZB); L 0–2 (0–2, 0–1)	4
Amr Ali	Boys' 76kg	Aguon (GUM); W T. Fall (7–0, 6–0)	2	3rd Place Match; Ergashev (UZB); L 0–2 (0–2, 0–1)	4
Amr Ali	Boys' 76kg	Kouagou (BEN); W Fall (3–0)	2	3rd Place Match; Ergashev (UZB); L 0–2 (0–2, 0–1)	4
Thoraya Mohamed	Girls' 70kg	Ali (POL); L 0–2 (0–1, 1–3)	4	7th Place Match; Nemeth (HUN); L 0–2 (0–1, 0–3)	8
Thoraya Mohamed	Girls' 70kg	Moon (KOR); L 0–2 (3–5, 0–1)	4	7th Place Match; Nemeth (HUN); L 0–2 (0–1, 0–3)	8
Thoraya Mohamed	Girls' 70kg	Kushkenova (KAZ); L Fall (4–0, 2–4, 1-6)	4	7th Place Match; Nemeth (HUN); L 0–2 (0–1, 0–3)	8

Greco-Roman

Athlete	Event	Pools		Final	Rank
Athlete	Event	Groups	Rank	Final	Rank
Mahmoud Hussein	Boys' 42kg	Flores (CUB); L 1–2 (1–0, 0–3, 0-1)	4	7th Place Match; BYE	7
Mahmoud Hussein	Boys' 42kg	Khamseh (IRI); L Fall (1–4)	4	7th Place Match; BYE	7
Mahmoud Hussein	Boys' 42kg	Baimaganbetov (KAZ); L 0–2 (0–6, 0–5)	4	7th Place Match; BYE	7
Hamdy Abdelwahab	Boys' 85kg	Mweia (SOL); W Fall (7–0)	1	Adzhigov (RUS); L Fall (0–1, 0–2)	Silver medal
Hamdy Abdelwahab	Boys' 85kg	Al-Abedi (IRQ); W 2–0 (1–0, 3–1)	1	Adzhigov (RUS); L Fall (0–1, 0–2)	Silver medal
Hamdy Abdelwahab	Boys' 85kg	Sheridan (USA); W 2–1 (0-3, 3–0, 1–0)	1	Adzhigov (RUS); L Fall (0–1, 0–2)	Silver medal
