= Modern pentathlon at the 2010 Summer Youth Olympics – Girls' individual =

The girl's Modern pentathlon competitions at the 2010 Summer Youth Olympics in Singapore were held on August 21, at the Singapore Sports School.

Only the fencing, swimming, shooting and running portions were done at the Youth Olympics. The results of each of the four segments of the modern pentathlon were converted into points scores based on a par value of 1000 points per event. Competitors doing better than par would receive more points. At the end of the first two segments, the points would be calculated and the pentathletes would be handicapped for the final segment based on their scores such that a simultaneous finish in that segment would result in identical overall scores.

The first segment was one touch épée, the second was 200 metre freestyle swimming and the final segment was combined running and shooting where athletes ran a total of 3000 metres and shot using the laser pistol.

== Medalists ==
Gold	Silver	Bronze
Leydi Laura Moya Lopez; Cuba	Zsófia Földházi; Hungary	Anastasiya Spas; Ukraine

== Results ==
Rank	Athlete	Fencing		Swimming		Running and Shooting		Total
Rank	Athlete	Wins-Loss	Points	Time	Points	Time	Points	Total
Gold medal	Leydi Laura Moya Lopez (CUB)	12-11	840	2:22.25	1096	11:49.47	2164	4100
Silver medal	Zsófia Földházi (HUN)	16-7	1000	2:09.30	1252	13:14.14	1824	4076
Bronze medal	Anastasiya Spas (UKR)	16-7	1000	2:20.62	1116	12:43.95	1948	4064
4	Anna Olesinski (USA)	14-9	920	2:27.69	1028	12:21.48	2036	3984
5	Anna Maliszewska (POL)	15-8	960	2:25.95	1056	12:45.10	1940	3956
6	Gintare Venckauskaite (LTU)	8-15	680	2:26.12	1048	11:42.28	2192	3920
7	Wenjing Zhu (CHN)	12-11	840	2:26.54	1044	12:37.04	1972	3856
8	Min Ji Choi (KOR)	15-8	960	2:14.01	1192	13:56.35	1656	3808
9	Tamara Vega (MEX)	10-13	760	2:24.07	1072	12:39.30	1964	3796
9	Gulnaz Gubaydullina (RUS)	8-15	680	2:12.87	1208	12:53.28	1908	3796
11	Gloria Tocchi (ITA)	15-8	960	2:26.64	1044	13:28.70	1768	3772
12	Jihan El Midany (EGY)	9-14	720	2:24.01	1072	12:52.33	1912	3704
13	Marharyta Maseikava (BLR)	7-16	640	2:21.80	1100	13:02.76	1872	3612
14	Nuria Chavarria (ESP)	17-6	1040	2:35.11	940	14:07.58	1612	3592
15	Manon Carpentier (FRA)	9-14	720	2:24.54	1068	13:22.15	1792	3580
16	Alice Lencova (CZE)	17-6	1040	2:28.99	1016	14:44.43	1464	3520
16	Franziska Hanko (GER)	9-14	720	2:30.85	992	13:18.50	1808	3520
18	Valerie Lim (SIN)	5-18	560	2:26.23	1048	13:20.91	1800	3408
19	Dilyara Ilyassova (KAZ)	13-10	880	2:49.10	772	13:34.88	1744	3396
20	Sindija Roga (LAT)	9-14	720	2:27.96	1028	14:03.83	1628	3376
21	Emily Greenan (IRL)	8-15	680	2:22.10	1096	14:15.80	1580	3356
22	Beatriche Gencheva (BUL)	11-12	800	2:23.53	1080	14:46.05	1456	3336
23	Ela Sedilekova (SVK)	7-16	640	2:29.70	1004	13:56.72	1656	3300
24	Mariana Laporte (BRA)	9-14	720	2:25.60	1056	15:03.67	1388	3164
