= Wrestling at the 2010 Summer Youth Olympics – Boys' Greco-Roman 42 kg =

The boys' 42 kg Greco-Roman tournament in wrestling at the 2010 Summer Youth Olympics was held on August 15 at the International Convention Centre.

The event limited competitors to a maximum of 42 kilograms of body mass. The tournament had two groups where wrestlers compete in a round-robin format. The winners of each group would go on to play for the gold medal, second placers played for the bronze medal while everyone else played for classification depending on where they ranked in the group stage.

== Medalists ==
| Gold | Silver | Bronze |
|---|---|---|
| Murad Bazarov; Azerbaijan | Yosvanys Peña Flores; Cuba | Akan Baimaganbetov; Kazakhstan |

== Group stages ==
=== Group A ===
| Athlete | Pld | C. Points | T. Points |
|---|---|---|---|
| Murad Bazarov (AZE) | 2 | 6 | 15 |
| Oleksiy Zhabskyy (UKR) | 2 | 4 | 10 |
| Henry Pilay (ECU) | 2 | 0 | 2 |

| Murad Bazarov (AZE) | 2-0 (7–0, 4–0) | Oleksiy Zhabskyy (UKR) |
| Murad Bazarov (AZE) | 2-0 (1–0, 3–0) | Henry Pilay (ECU) |
| Oleksiy Zhabskyy (UKR) | Fall (7–1, 3–1) | Henry Pilay (ECU) |

=== Group B ===
| Athlete | Pld | C. Points | T. Points |
|---|---|---|---|
| Yosvanys Peña Flores (CUB) | 3 | 10 | 10 |
| Akan Baimaganbetov (KAZ) | 3 | 7 | 26 |
| Mehrdad Khamseh (IRI) | 3 | 5 | 8 |
| Mahmoud Hussein (EGY) | 3 | 1 | 4 |

| Mahmoud Hussein (EGY) | 1-2 (1–0, 0-3, 0-1) | Yosvanys Peña Flores (CUB) |
| Mehrdad Khamseh (IRI) | 0-2 (0-5, 4-7) | Akan Baimaganbetov (KAZ) |
| Mahmoud Hussein (EGY) | Fall (1-4) | Mehrdad Khamseh (IRI) |
| Yosvanys Peña Flores (CUB) | 2-1 (4–0, 0-3, 2–0) | Akan Baimaganbetov (KAZ) |
| Mahmoud Hussein (EGY) | 0-2 (0-6, 0-5) | Akan Baimaganbetov (KAZ) |
| Yosvanys Peña Flores (CUB) | 2-0 (1–0, 1–0) | Mehrdad Khamseh (IRI) |

== Classification ==
=== 5th-place match ===
| Henry Pilay (ECU) | 1-2 (0-1, 1–0, 0-1) | Mehrdad Khamseh (EGY) |

=== Bronze-medal match ===
| Oleksiy Zhabskyy (UKR) | 0-2 (0-2, 1-7) | Akan Baimaganbetov (KAZ) |

=== Gold-medal match ===
| Murad Bazarov (AZE) | 2-0 (2–0, 1–0) | Yosvanys Peña Flores (CUB) |

== Final rankings ==
| Rank | Athlete |
|---|---|
| Gold medal | Murad Bazarov (AZE) |
| Silver medal | Yosvanys Peña Flores (CUB) |
| Bronze medal | Akan Baimaganbetov (KAZ) |
| 4 | Oleksiy Zhabskyy (UKR) |
| 5 | Mehrdad Khamseh (IRI) |
| 6 | Henry Pilay (ECU) |
| 7 | Mahmoud Hussein (EGY) |
