= Weightlifting at the 2010 Summer Youth Olympics – Boys' 77 kg =

The boys' 77 kg weightlifting event was the fourth men's event at the weightlifting competition at the 2010 Summer Youth Olympics, with competitors up to 77 kg. The whole competition took place on August 18 at 11:00.

Each lifter performed both the snatch and clean and jerk lifts, with the final score being the sum of the lifter's best result in each. Each athlete received three attempts in each of the two lifts; the score which the lifter received is the heaviest weight successfully lifted within the three allowed attempts.

== Medalists ==
Gold	Artem Okulov; Russia	327 kg
Silver	Chatuphum Chinnawong; Thailand	311 kg
Bronze	Rustem Sybay; Kazakhstan	285 kg

== Results ==
Rank	Name	Group	Body Weight	Snatch (kg)				Clean & Jerk (kg)				Total (kg)
Rank	Name	Group	Body Weight	1	2	3	Res	1	2	3	Res	Total (kg)
1st place, gold medalist(s)	Artem Okulov (RUS)	A	76.59	140	142	145	145	170	~~177~~	182	182	327
2nd place, silver medalist(s)	Chatuphum Chinnawong (THA)	A	76.69	133	138	141	141	160	170	~~183~~	170	311
3rd place, bronze medalist(s)	Rustem Sybay (KAZ)	A	76.78	~~125~~	125	130	130	155	~~162~~	~~162~~	155	285
4	Steven Kari (PNG)	A	75.20	115	~~120~~	~~120~~	115	145	150	155	155	270
5	Huang Yi-Yuan (TPE)	A	75.87	105	~~110~~	112	112	145	149	~~154~~	149	261
6	Luca Parla (ITA)	A	72.76	100	108	111	111	130	137	~~141~~	137	248
7	Kabuati Silas Bob (KIR)	A	75.35	90	95	100	100	120	125	130	130	230
8	Liam Larkins (AUS)	A	76.02	~~85~~	85	92	92	~~110~~	110	120	120	212
	Ossama Khattab (EGY)	A	76.65	~~132~~	~~132~~	~~132~~		–	–	–	–	–
