= Karim Abdelrahim =

Egyptian handball player

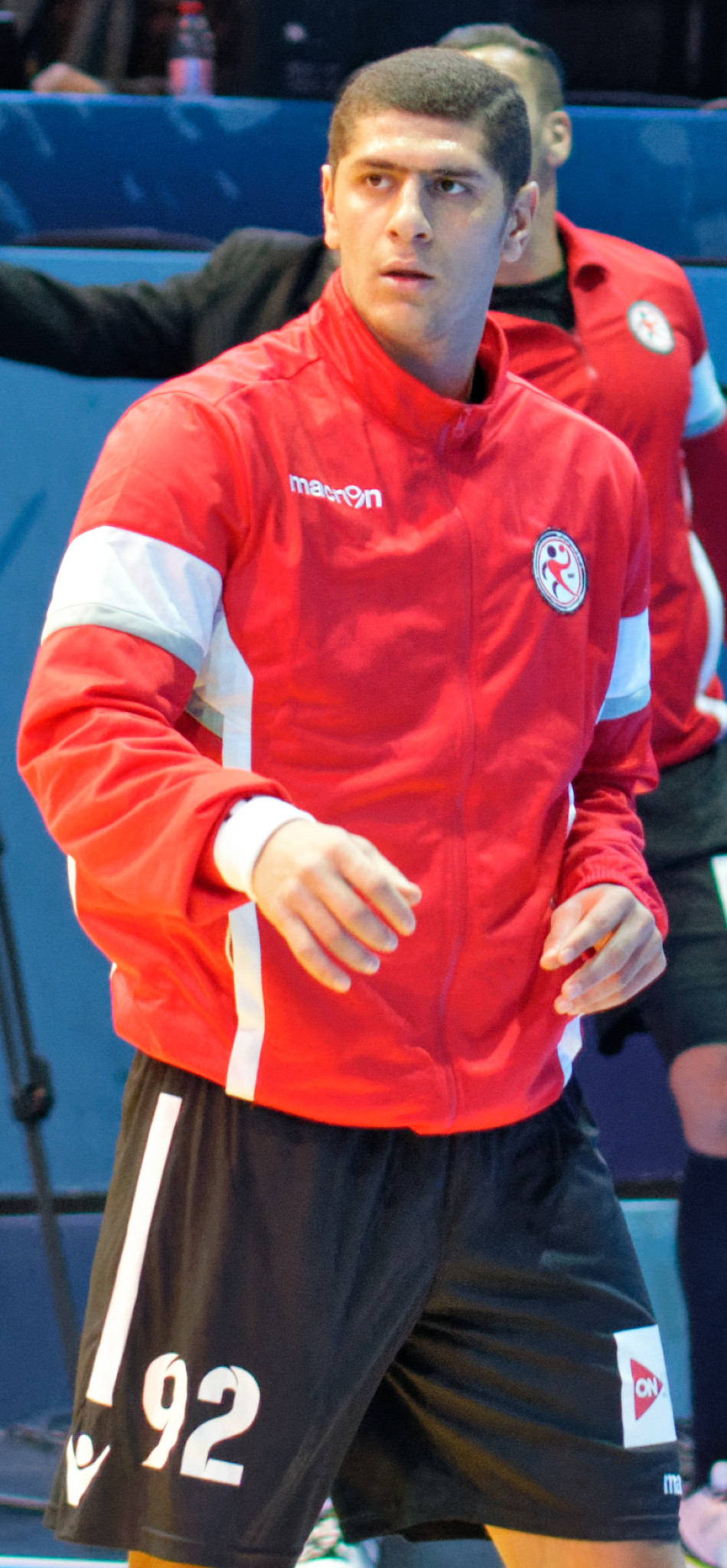

Personal information
- Nationality: Egyptian
- Born: 27 October 1992 (age 33)
- Height: 1.92 m (6 ft 4 in)

Sport
- Sport: Handball
- Position: Left wing
- Current club: Zamalek
National team
Years	Team	Apps
–	Egypt	51
Medal record
Mediterranean Games
Gold medal – first place	2013 Mersin	Team

Karim Abdelrahim (born 27 October 1992) is an Egyptian handball player for Zamalek and the Egyptian national team.

He participated at the 2017 World Men's Handball Championship.
