= Gymnastics at the 2010 Summer Youth Olympics – Men's artistic individual all-around =

Junior men's artistic individual all-around competition at the 2010 Summer Youth Olympics was held at the Bishan Sports Hall on August 18.

For each competitor in the men's qualification, the scores for all six apparatus were summed to give an all-around qualification score. The top 18 competitors moved on to the individual all-around final. In the individual all-around final, each gymnast competed on each apparatus again. Only scores from the final were used to determine final rankings.

== Medalists ==
Gold	Silver	Bronze
Yuya Kamoto; Japan	Oleg Stepko; Ukraine	Zhu Xiaodong; China

== Final round results ==
Position	Gymnast	Floor (gymnastics)	Pommel horse	Rings (gymnastics)	Vault (gymnastics)	Parallel bars	Horizontal bar	Total
1st place, gold medalist(s)	Yuya Kamoto (JPN)	14.250	13.350	14.400	15.700	14.600	14.050	86.350
2nd place, silver medalist(s)	Oleg Stepko (UKR)	14.150	13.300	14.000	15.550	14.450	13.900	85.350
3rd place, bronze medalist(s)	Zhu Xiaodong (CHN)	14.300	13.550	13.600	15.700	13.750	14.100	85.000
4	Andrei Muntean (ROU)	14.000	12.950	14.650	15.800	13.850	13.700	84.950
5	Sam Oldham (GBR)	13.500	13.950	14.000	15.800	14.250	13.150	84.650
6	Daniil Kazachkov (RUS)	14.050	13.700	13.550	15.550	13.150	14.000	84.000
7	Ernesto Vila Sarria (CUB)	13.550	12.300	13.100	15.700	14.100	13.450	82.200
8	Vahan Vardanyan (ARM)	13.700	13.250	14.000	14.850	13.100	13.250	82.150
9	Daniel Weinert (GER)	13.800	13.450	13.250	14.700	13.450	13.350	82.000
10	Thomas Neuteleers (BEL)	14.150	11.850	13.550	14.800	13.950	13.550	81.850
11	Ludovico Edalli (ITA)	13.450	12.750	13.450	14.650	13.600	13.700	81.600
12	Nikolaos Iliopoulos (GRE)	11.950	13.350	13.900	14.900	13.850	13.450	81.400
13	Levente Vagner (HUN)	13.500	13.100	13.650	14.450	13.650	12.900	81.250
14	Amr Ahmed (EGY)	12.850	13.450	12.750	14.700	13.650	13.500	80.900
15	Brandon Prost (FRA)	13.300	13.100	13.300	15.150	12.600	13.250	80.700
16	Eduard Shulov (UZB)	13.850	12.250	12.800	15.200	12.200	13.400	79.700
17	Robert Watson (CAN)	14.000	10.700	13.450	15.050	13.550	12.900	79.650
18	Michalis Krasias (CYP)	13.550	11.500	13.200	14.600	12.500	12.800	78.150

== Reserves ==
The reserves for the All Around Final were:

- Oliver Hegi (SUI) (19th place)
- Jesse Glenn (USA) (20th place)
- Arthur Mariano (BRA) (21st place)
- Jo Yeonggwang (KOR) (22nd place)
