= Canoeing at the 2010 Summer Youth Olympics =

Canoeing at the I Summer Youth Olympic Games
- Venue: Marina Reservoir
- Dates: 21–25 August
- No. of events: 6 (4 boys, 2 girls)
- Competitors: 127 (80 boys, 47 girls) from 42 nations

Canoeing at the 2010 Summer Youth Olympics in Singapore took place from August 21 to August 25 at the Marina Reservoir. There were sprints on a 420m course and a slalom on flat water and not an artificial Canoe Slalom course.

== Competition schedule ==
| Event date | Event day | Starting time | Event details |
|---|---|---|---|
| 22 August | Sunday | 16:20 | Girls' Head to head Canoe Sprint K1 |
| 22 August | Sunday | 16:30 | Boys' Head to head Canoe Sprint C1 |
| 22 August | Sunday | 16:40 | Boys' Head to head Canoe Sprint K1 |
| 25 August | Wednesday | 16:30 | Girls' Obstacle Canoe Slalom K1 |
| 25 August | Wednesday | 16:35 | Boys' Obstacle Canoe Slalom C1 |
| 25 August | Wednesday | 16:40 | Boys' Obstacle Canoe Slalom K1 |

== Medal summary ==
=== Medal table ===
| Rank | Nation | Gold | Silver | Bronze | Total |
|---|---|---|---|---|---|
| 1 | Hungary | 2 | 0 | 0 | 2 |
| 2 | China | 1 | 1 | 0 | 2 |
| 3 | Australia | 1 | 0 | 0 | 1 |
| 3 | Cuba | 1 | 0 | 0 | 1 |
| 3 | Slovenia | 1 | 0 | 0 | 1 |
| 6 | Germany | 0 | 2 | 0 | 2 |
| 7 | Czech Republic | 0 | 1 | 1 | 2 |
| 7 | Ukraine | 0 | 1 | 1 | 2 |
| 9 | Slovakia | 0 | 1 | 0 | 1 |
| 10 | Austria | 0 | 0 | 1 | 1 |
| 10 | Belgium | 0 | 0 | 1 | 1 |
| 10 | Mexico | 0 | 0 | 1 | 1 |
| 10 | Spain | 0 | 0 | 1 | 1 |
| Totals (13 entries) | | 6 | 6 | 6 | 18 |

=== Events ===
==== Boys' Events ====
| Games | Gold | Silver | Bronze |
|---|---|---|---|
| Head-to-head Sprint C1 Men | Osvaldo Sacerio; Cuba | Anatolii Melnyk; Ukraine | Pedro Castañeda; Mexico |
| Head-to-head Sprint K1 Men | Sándor Tótka; Hungary | Tom Liebscher; Germany | Inígo Garcia; Spain |
| Obstacle Canoe Slalom C1 Men | Wang Xiaodong; China | Dennis Söter; Germany | Anatolii Melnyk; Ukraine |
| Obstacle Canoe Slalom K1 Men | Simon Brus; Slovenia | Miroslav Urban; Slovakia | Jiří Prskavec; Czech Republic |

==== Girls' Events ====
| Games | Gold | Silver | Bronze |
|---|---|---|---|
| Head-to-head Sprint K1 Women | Ramóna Farkasdi; Hungary | Huang Jieyi; China | Hermien Peters; Belgium |
| Obstacle Canoe Slalom K1 Women | Jessica Fox; Australia | Pavlína Zástěrová; Czech Republic | Viktoria Wolffhardt; Austria |
