= Kazakhstan at the 2010 Summer Youth Olympics =

- IOC code: KAZ
- NOC: Kazakhstan Olympic Committee

in Singapore
- Competitors: 47 in 17 sports
- Flag bearer: Adlet Rakishev
- Medals Ranked 24th: Gold 2 Silver 2 Bronze 2 Total 6

Summer Youth Olympics appearances (overview)
- 2010; 2014; 2018

Kazakhstan participated in the 2010 Summer Youth Olympics in Singapore.

== Medalists ==
Medal	Name	Sport	Event	Date
Gold	Zhanibek Kandybayev	Wrestling	Men's Greco-Roman 69kg	15 Aug
Gold	Zhazira Zhapparkul	Weightlifting	Women's 63kg	17 Aug
Gold	Kairat Agibayev	Judo	Mixed Team	25 Aug
Silver	Nursultan Mamayev	Taekwondo	Men's 55kg	16 Aug
Silver	Zulfiya Chinshanlo	Weightlifting	Women's 58kg	17 Aug
Bronze	Akan Baimaganbetov	Wrestling	Men's Greco-Roman 42kg	15 Aug
Bronze	Rustem Sybay	Weightlifting	Men's 77kg	18 Aug

== Archery ==
Girls

Athlete	Event	Ranking Round		Round of 32	Round of 16	Quarterfinals	Semifinals	Final	
Athlete	Event	Score	Seed	Opposition Score	Opposition Score	Opposition Score	Opposition Score	Opposition Score	Rank
Farida Tukebayeva	Girls’ Individual	635	6	Leek (USA); L 4-6	Did not advance				17

Mixed Team

Athlete	Event	Partner	Round of 32	Round of 16	Quarterfinals	Semifinals	Final	
Athlete	Event	Partner	Opposition Score	Opposition Score	Opposition Score	Opposition Score	Opposition Score	Rank
Farida Tukebayeva	Mixed Team	Teodor Todorov (BUL)	Paraskevopoulou (GRE)/ Rajh (SLO); L 2-6	Did not advance				17

== Athletics ==
=== Boys ===
Track and Road Events

Athletes	Event	Qualification		Final	
Athletes	Event	Result	Rank	Result	Rank
Ivan Salyahhov	Boys’ 10km Walk			DNF	

Field Events

Athletes	Event	Qualification		Final	
Athletes	Event	Result	Rank	Result	Rank
Yevgeniy Milovatskiy	Boys’ Discus Throw	54.15	9 qB	53.27	11
Vladislav Podtsuk	Boys’ Javelin Throw	65.69	13 qB	63.87	14

=== Girls ===
Track and Road Events

Athletes	Event	Qualification		Final	
Athletes	Event	Result	Rank	Result	Rank
Elina Mikhina	Girls’ 400m	58.76	16 qC	58.11	17
Marina Zaiko	Girls’ 400m Hurdles	1:01.88	9 qB	1:01.42	11
Wei Liang (SIN); Ching-Hsien Liao (TPE); Marina Zaiko (KAZ); Elina Mikhina (KAZ)	Girls’ Medley Relay			2:15.01	5

== Boxing ==
Boys

Athlete	Event	Preliminaries	Semifinals	Final	Rank
Adlet Rakishev	Middleweight (75kg)	Zoltán Harcsa (HUN); L 1-6	Did not advance	5th Place Bout; Joe Ward (IRL); W w/o	5

== Canoeing ==
Boys

Athlete	Event	Time Trial		Round 1	Round 2 (Rep)	Round 3	Round 4	Round 5	Final
Athlete	Event	Time	Rank	Round 1	Round 2 (Rep)	Round 3	Round 4	Round 5	Final
Timofey Yemelyanov	Boys’ C1 Slalom	2:12.15	12	Daniels (CAN); L 2:08.96-1:45.46	Cardenas (CUB); L DSQ-2:02.69	Did not advance			
Timofey Yemelyanov	Boys’ C1 Sprint	1:44.21	3	Soeter (GER); W 1:48.29-2:53.93		Liferi (ROU); L 1:48.55-1:48.22	Liferi (ROU); L DNF-1:54.80	Did not advance	

== Cycling ==
Cross Country

Athlete	Event	Time	Rank	Points
Vadim Galeyev	Boys’ Cross Country	1:03:58	15	68
Rimma Luchshenko	Girls’ Cross Country	55:52	15	38

Time Trial

Athlete	Event	Time	Rank	Points
Alexey Lutsenko	Boys’ Time Trial	4:04.76	4	10
Rimma Luchshenko	Girls’ Time Trial	3:35.05	8	24

BMX

Athlete	Event	Seeding Round		Quarterfinals							Semifinals							Final		
Athlete	Event	Seeding Round		Run 1		Run 2		Run 3		Rank	Run 1		Run 2		Run 3		Rank	Final		
Athlete	Event	Time	Rank	Time	Rank	Time	Rank	Time	Rank	Rank	Time	Rank	Time	Rank	Time	Rank	Rank	Time	Rank	Points
Nurlan Duisenov	Boys’ BMX	42.827	24	42.216	6	43.279	6	42.672	6	6	Did not advance									72
Rimma Luchshenko	Girls’ BMX	1:00.525	30	46.830	7	45.994	6	47.293	6	6	Did not advance									40

Road Race

Athlete	Event	Time	Rank	Points
Vadim Galeyev	Boys’ Road Race	1:05:44	11	53*
Alexey Lutsenko	Boys’ Road Race	1:05:44	23	
Nurlan Duisenov	Boys’ Road Race	1:05:44	24	

Overall

Team	Event	Cross Country Pts		Time Trial Pts		BMX Pts		Road Race Pts	Total	Rank
Team	Event	Boys	Girls	Boys	Girls	Boys	Girls	Road Race Pts	Total	Rank
Rimma Luchshenko; Vadim Galeyev; Alexey Lutsenko; Nurlan Duisenov	Mixed Team	68	38	10	24	72	40	53*	305	17

- * Received -5 for finishing road race with all three racers

== Equestrian ==
Athlete	Horse	Event	Round 1			Round 2			Total	Jump-Off		Rank
Athlete	Horse	Event	Penalties		Rank	Penalties		Rank	Total	Penalties	Time	Rank
Athlete	Horse	Event	Jump	Time	Rank	Jump	Time	Rank	Total	Penalties	Time	Rank
Timur Patarov	Chatham Park Rosie	Individual Jumping	0	0	1	8	0	19	8			9
Mohamad Alanzarouti (SYR); Timur Patarov (KAZ); Abdurahman Al Marri (QAT); Pei Jia Caroline Chew (SIN); Sheikh Ali Abdulla Majid Alqassimi (UAE)	Van Diemen; Chatham Park Rosie; Emmaville Persuasion; Gatineau; Pearl Monarch	Team Jumping	~~8~~; ~~EL~~; 4; 4; 4	~~0~~; ~~EL~~; 0; 0; 0	4	~~4~~; 0; ~~8~~; 0; 0	~~0~~; 0; ~~0~~; 0; 0	1	12			4

== Fencing ==
Group Stage

Athlete	Event	Match 1	Match 2	Match 3	Match 4	Match 5	Seed
Kirill Zhakupov	Boys’ Épée	Svichkar (UKR); W 5-2	Fichera (ITA); L 4-5	Kruk (POL); L 3-5	Melaragno (BRA); W 5-4	Saleh (EGY); W 5-1	6

Knock-Out Stage

Athlete	Event	Round of 16	Quarterfinals	Semifinals	Final	Rank
Kirill Zhakupov	Boys’ Épée	Svichkar (UKR); W 15-14	Na (KOR); L 13-14	Did not advance		5
Asia-Oceania 2 Wan Yini (CHN); Kirill Zhakupov (KAZ); Wang Lianlian (CHN); Jackson Wang (HKG); Hye Won Lee (KOR); Nicholas Edward Choi (HKG)	Mixed Team		Europe 2 L 21-30	5th-8th Europe 4 L 20-30	7th-8th Americas 2 L 27-28	8

== Gymnastics ==
=== Artistic Gymnastics ===
Boys

Athlete	Event	Floor		Pommel Horse		Rings		Vault		Parallel Bars		Horizontal Bar		Total	
Athlete	Event	Score	Rank	Score	Rank	Score	Rank	Score	Rank	Score	Rank	Score	Rank	Score	Rank
Viktor Kocherin	Boys' Qualification	12.600	34	13.100	19	12.400	32	15.550	11	12.050	34	12.400	32	78.100	32

Girls

Athlete	Event	Vault		Uneven Bars		Beam		Floor		Total	
Athlete	Event	Score	Rank	Score	Rank	Score	Rank	Score	Rank	Score	Rank
Moldir Azimbay	Girls' Qualification	12.550	32	12.600	14	12.300	27	11.950	26	49.400	24

=== Rhythmic Gymnastics ===
Individual

Athlete	Event	Qualification						Final					
Athlete	Event	Rope	Hoop	Ball	Clubs	Total	Rank	Rope	Hoop	Ball	Clubs	Total	Rank
Yuliya Kizima	Girls' Individual All-Around	21.050	21.200	20.100	20.775	83.125	13	Did not advance					

== Handball ==
Squad List	Event	Group Stage		Semifinal	3rd Place Match	Rank
Squad List	Event	Group B	Rank	Semifinal	3rd Place Match	Rank
Irina Danilova; Mariya Zaitseva; Marina Bazhina; Akmaral Bekhairova; Lyubov Tokareva; Marta Gavrilova; Olga Dergunova; Alina Sundeyeva; Aida Zhanarbekova; Valentina Degtyareva; Yevgeniya Latkina; Tatyana Kurassova; Dinara Ulumbetova; Mariya Prosvetova	Girls' Handball	Australia; W 45-16	2 Q	Russia; L 19-41	Brazil; L 23-45	4
Irina Danilova; Mariya Zaitseva; Marina Bazhina; Akmaral Bekhairova; Lyubov Tokareva; Marta Gavrilova; Olga Dergunova; Alina Sundeyeva; Aida Zhanarbekova; Valentina Degtyareva; Yevgeniya Latkina; Tatyana Kurassova; Dinara Ulumbetova; Mariya Prosvetova	Girls' Handball	Denmark; L 15-40	2 Q	Russia; L 19-41	Brazil; L 23-45	4

== Judo ==
Individual

Athlete	Event	Round 1	Round 2	Round 3	Semifinals	Final	Rank
Athlete	Event	Opposition Result	Opposition Result	Opposition Result	Opposition Result	Opposition Result	Rank
Kairat Agibayev	Boys' -66 kg	Tugushi (GEO); W 100-000	Cisse (SEN); W 100-000	Hyon (PRK); L 000-100	Repechage; Tugushi (GEO); L 000-010	Did not advance	9

Team

Team	Event	Round 1	Round 2	Semifinals	Final	Rank
Team	Event	Opposition Result	Opposition Result	Opposition Result	Opposition Result	Rank
Essen; Lesly Cano (PER); Pedro Rivadulla (ESP); Andrea Krisandova (SVK); Kairat Agibayev (KAZ); Daryl Lokuku Ngambomo (COD); Miku Tashiro (JPN); Alex Maxell Garcia Mendoza (CUB)	Mixed Team	Munich; W 4-3	Chiba; W 5-2	Cairo; W 5-2	Belgrade; W 6-1	Gold medal

== Modern pentathlon ==
Athlete	Event	Fencing (Épée One Touch)			Swimming (200m Freestyle)			Running & Shooting (3000m, Laser Pistol)			Total Points	Final Rank
Athlete	Event	Results	Rank	Points	Time	Rank	Points	Time	Rank	Points	Total Points	Final Rank
German Sobolev	Boys' Individual	9-14	18	720	2:18.09	22	1144	12:10.35	18	2080	3944	20
Dilyara Ilyassova	Girls' Individual	13-10	9	880	2:49.10	24	772	13:34.88	16	1744	3396	19
Marharyta Maseikava (BLR); German Sobolev (KAZ)	Mixed Relay	44-48	15	800	2:07.98	18	1268	16:49.94	18	2044	4112	19
Dilyara Ilyassova (KAZ); Aleix Heredia (ESP)	Mixed Relay	56-36	2	920	2:20.06	24	1120	16:57.64	20	2012	4052	21

== Shooting ==
Rifle

Athlete	Event	Qualification		Final		
Athlete	Event	Score	Rank	Score	Total	Rank
Irshat Avkhadiyev	Boys' 10m Air Rifle	582	15	Did not advance		

== Swimming ==
Athletes	Event	Heat		Semifinal		Final	
Athletes	Event	Time	Position	Time	Position	Time	Position
Ruslan Baimanov	Boys’ 50m Backstroke			27.94	12	Did not advance	
Ruslan Baimanov	Boys’ 100m Backstroke	1:00.02	26	Did not advance			
Yekaterina Rudenko	Girls’ 50m Backstroke	30.75	10 Q	30.09	6 Q	29.65	5
Yekaterina Rudenko	Girls’ 100m Backstroke	1:08.32	31	Did not advance			
Yuliya Litvina	Girls’ 50m Breaststroke	33.49	13 Q	33.64	14	Did not advance	
Yuliya Litvina	Girls’ 100m Breaststroke	1:13.55	18	Did not advance			

== Taekwondo ==
Athlete	Event	Preliminary	Quarterfinal	Semifinal	Final	Rank
Nursultan Mamayev	Boys' -55kg	Ranjan Shrestha (NEP); W 8-3	José Cobas (CUB); W 2-0	Quoc Cuong Nguyen (VIE); W 6-5	Kaveh Rezaei (IRI); L 2-4	Silver medal

== Triathlon ==
Girls

Triathlete	Event	Swimming	Transit 1	Cycling	Transit 2	Running	Total time	Rank
Karolina Solovyova	Individual	10:33	0:39	33:20	0:32	21:55	1:06:59.78	21

Men's

Athlete	Event	Swim (1.5 km)	Trans 1	Bike (40 km)	Trans 2	Run (10 km)	Total	Rank
Kirill Uvarov	Individual	9:21	0:33	30:27	0:26	18:45	59:32.92	27

Mixed

Athlete	Event	Total Times per Athlete (Swim 250 m, Bike 7 km, Run 1.7 km)	Total Group Time	Rank
Tüvshinjargalyn Enkhjargal (MGL); Kirill Uvarov (KAZ); Mattika Maneekaew (THA); Scott Yiqiang Ang (SIN)	Mixed Team Relay; Asia 3	25:14; 21:02; 25:50; 22:22	1:34:28.69	15
Mingxiu Ma (CHN); Leong Tim Law (HKG); Karolina Solovyova (KAZ); Yuki Kubono (JPN)	Mixed Team Relay; Asia 2	22:55; 20:43; 23:54; 20:08	1:27:40.62	13

== Weightlifting ==
Athlete	Event	Snatch	Clean & Jerk	Total	Rank
Mavrick Faustino	Boys' 77kg	130	155	285	Bronze medal
Zulfiya Chinshanlo	Girls' 58kg	95	130	225	Silver medal
Zhazira Zhapparkul	Girls' 63kg	90	115	205	Gold medal

== Wrestling ==
Freestyle

Athlete	Event	Pools		Final	Rank
Athlete	Event	Groups	Rank	Final	Rank
Rimma Kushkenova	Girls' 70kg	Mohamed (EGY); W Fall (0–4, 4–2, 6-1)	2	3rd Place Match; Stankova (UKR); L 0–2 (0–8, 1–5)	4
Rimma Kushkenova	Girls' 70kg	Moon (KOR); L Fall (0–3)	2	3rd Place Match; Stankova (UKR); L 0–2 (0–8, 1–5)	4
Rimma Kushkenova	Girls' 70kg	Ali (POL); W Fall (5–1, 0-2, 5–0)	2	3rd Place Match; Stankova (UKR); L 0–2 (0–8, 1–5)	4

Greco-Roman

Athlete	Event	Pools		Final	Rank
Athlete	Event	Groups	Rank	Final	Rank
Akan Baimaganbetov	Boys' 42kg	Hussein (EGY); W 2–0 (6–0, 5–0)	2	3rd Place Match; Zhabskyy (UKR); W 2–0 (2–0, 7–1)	Bronze medal
Akan Baimaganbetov	Boys' 42kg	Khamseh (IRI); W 2–0 (5–0, 7–4)	2	3rd Place Match; Zhabskyy (UKR); W 2–0 (2–0, 7–1)	Bronze medal
Akan Baimaganbetov	Boys' 42kg	Flores (CUB); L 1–2 (0–4, 3–0, 0-2)	2	3rd Place Match; Zhabskyy (UKR); W 2–0 (2–0, 7–1)	Bronze medal
Zhanibek Kandybayev	Boys' 69kg	Nedashkouski (BLR); W 2–0 (1–0, 3–2)	1	Gedik (TUR); W 2–0 (1–0, 2–1)	Gold medal
Zhanibek Kandybayev	Boys' 69kg	Valor (COL); W 2–0 (7–0, 3–0)	1	Gedik (TUR); W 2–0 (1–0, 2–1)	Gold medal
Zhanibek Kandybayev	Boys' 69kg	Gonzalez (NCA); W T. Fall (6–0, 7–0)	1	Gedik (TUR); W 2–0 (1–0, 2–1)	Gold medal
