= Weightlifting at the 2010 Summer Youth Olympics – Boys' 85 kg =

The boys' 85 kg weightlifting event was the fifth men's event at the weightlifting competition at the 2010 Summer Youth Olympics, with competitors up to85kg. The whole competition took place on August 18 at 18:00.

Each lifter performed in both the snatch and clean and jerk lifts, with the final score being the sum of the lifter's best result in each. The athlete received three attempts in each of the two lifts; the score for the lift was the heaviest weight successfully lifted.

== Medalists ==
Gold	Georgi Shikov; Bulgaria	335 kg
Silver	Alexey Kosov; Russia	334 kg
Bronze	Kostyantyn Reva; Ukraine	320 kg

== Results ==
Rank	Name	Group	Body Weight	Snatch (kg)				Clean & Jerk (kg)				Total (kg)
Rank	Name	Group	Body Weight	1	2	3	Res	1	2	3	Res	Total (kg)
1st place, gold medalist(s)	Georgi Shikov (BUL)	A	84.34	142	148	152	152	175	180	183	183	335
2nd place, silver medalist(s)	Alexey Kosov (RUS)	A	81.32	~~150~~	150	154	154	175	~~180~~	180>	180	334
3rd place, bronze medalist(s)	Kostyantyn Reva (UKR)	A	84.68	~~140~~	140	145	145	170	175	~~191~~	175	320
4	Aliaksandr Venskel (BLR)	A	83.88	130	137	~~141~~	137	160	170	~~176~~	170	307
5	Jose Miguel Velez (COL)	A	84.28	~~125~~	125	130	130	152	~~166~~	~~166~~	152	282
6	Christopher Pavon (HON)	A	84.53	120	~~125~~	~~126~~	120	151	155	~~161~~	155	275
7	Saumaleto Fa'agu (ASA)	A	83.37	90	95	~~100~~	95	110	115	~~120~~	115	210
8	Mavrick Faustino (PLW)	A	79.39	80	85	90	90	100	107	110	110	200
9	Irfan Butt (PAK)	A	84.30	81	86	91	91	95	105	108	108	199
