= Cuba at the 2010 Summer Youth Olympics =

- IOC code: CUB
- NOC: Cuban Olympic Committee

in Singapore
- Competitors: 41 in 15 sports
- Flag bearer: Wilfredo León Venero
- Medals Ranked 5th: Gold 9 Silver 3 Bronze 2 Total 14

Summer Youth Olympics appearances
- 2010; 2014; 2018; 2026

Cuba competed at the 2010 Summer Youth Olympics, the inaugural Youth Olympic Games, held in Singapore from 14 August to 26 August 2010.

== Medalists ==
Medal	Name	Sport	Event	Date
Gold	Ernesto Vila Sarria	Gymnastics	Men's floor exercise	21 Aug
Gold	Leydi Laura Moya Lopez	Modern Pentathlon	Girls' individual	21 Aug
Gold	Cardenas Sacerio	Canoeing	Canoe sprint men	22 Aug
Gold	Norge Lara Sotomayor	Athletics	Boys' 400m hurdles	23 Aug
Gold	Radame Fabar Sánchez	Athletics	Boys' triple jump	23 Aug
Gold	Robeisy Eloy Ramírez	Boxing	Men's bantam 54kg	25 Aug
Gold	Irosvani Duverger	Boxing	Men's light heavy 81kg	25 Aug
Gold	Lenier Eunice Pero	Boxing	Men's heavy 91kg	25 Aug
Gold	Alex Maxell García Mendoza	Judo	Mixed event	25 Aug
Gold	Cuban Boys' Volleyball team: Dariel Albo; Carlos Araujo; Yulian Durán; Yonder García; Alejandro González; Alexis Lamadrid; Juan Andrés León; Wilfredo León; Nelson Loyola; Yassel Perdomo	Volleyball	Boys' Tournament	26 Aug
Silver	Yosvanys Peña Flores	Wrestling	Men's Greco-Roman 42kg	15 Aug
Silver	Abraham de Jesús Conyedo Ruano	Wrestling	Men's freestyle 100kg	17 Aug
Silver	Lismania Muñoz Barcelay	Athletics	Girls' javelin throw	22 Aug
Bronze	Ediel Marquez Ona	Weightlifting	Men's 69kg	17 Aug
Bronze	Yuleimi Abreu	Taekwondo	Women's +63kg	19 Aug

== Athletics ==
=== Boys ===
Track and Road Events

Athletes	Event	Qualification		Final	
Athletes	Event	Result	Rank	Result	Rank
Yordan Luis Ofarril Olivera	Boys’ 110m hurdles	13.80	4 Q	13.69	5
Lara Norge Sotomayor	Boys’ 400m hurdles	51.74	1 Q	50.69	Gold medal

Field Events

Athletes	Event	Qualification		Final	
Athletes	Event	Result	Rank	Result	Rank
Yandris Pompa Vazquez	Boys’ javelin throw	69.06	8 Q	68.65	8
Daniel Alejandro Cruz García	Boys’ hammer throw	72.17	2 Q	62.42	7
Yunier Duran Llamo	Boys' long jump	7.31	5 Q	7.41	4
Radame Fabar Sánchez	Boys' triple jump	15.99	1 Q	16.37	Gold medal

=== Girls ===
Track and road events

Athletes	Event	Qualification		Final	
Athletes	Event	Result	Rank	Result	Rank
Lisneidy Ines Veitia Cordova	Girls’ 100m	12.22	11 qB	12.15	11
Yaneisi Ribeaux	Girls’ 200m	DNF qC		DNS	
Dayrina Sotolongo García	Girls’ 1000m	DSQ qB		2:56.74	20

Field events

Athletes	Event	Qualification		Final	
Athletes	Event	Result	Rank	Result	Rank
Lismania Muñoz Barcelay	Girls’ javelin throw	51.99	1 Q	52.40	Silver medal
Marianne Fuentes Díaz	Girls’ hammer throw	48.89	13 qB	49.59	12

== Boxing ==
Boys

Athlete	Event	Preliminaries	Semifinals	Final	Rank
Robeisy Eloy Ramírez	Bantamweight (54kg)	Stan Nicette (SEY); W 17-3	Dawid Michelus (POL); W 3-1	Shiva Thapa (IND); W 5-2	Gold medal
Irosvani Duverger	Light Heavyweight (81kg)	Anzor Elpiev (RUS); W 7-1	Sardorbek Begaliev (UZB); W 3-1	Burak Aksin (TUR); W 12-4	Gold medal
Lenier Eunice Pero	Heavyweight (91kg)	Joshua Temple (USA); W RSC R1 2:11	Umit Can Patrir (TUR); W 6-0	Fabio Turchi (ITA); W RSCH R1 1:27	Gold medal

== Canoeing ==
Boys

Athlete	Event	Time Trial		Round 1	Round 2 (Rep)	Round 3	Round 4	Round 5	Final	Rank
Athlete	Event	Time	Rank	Round 1	Round 2 (Rep)	Round 3	Round 4	Round 5	Final	Rank
Osvaldo Sacerio Cardenas	Boys’ C1 slalom	2:10.68	11	Melnyk (UKR); L 1:56.59-1:48.41	Yemelyanov (KAZ); W 2:02.69-DSQ	Daniels (CAN); L 2:06.33-1:47.73	Did not advance			
Osvaldo Sacerio Cardenas	Boys’ C1 sprint	1:42.77	2	Daniels (CAN); W 1:45.11-3:29.00		Chimbumba (ANG); W 1:43.44-2:11.81	Kitsev (AZE); W 1:47.23-1:52.31	Liferi (ROU); W 1:48.42-2:02.06	Melnyk (UKR); W 1:48.37-1:51.17	1st place, gold medalist(s)
Renier Mora Jimenez	Boys’ K1 slalom	1:42.48	12	Aghamirz. (IRI); L 1:41.67-1:39.13	Dolata (POL); W 1:46.40-1:53.42	Prskavec (CZE); L 1:49.73-1:29.58	Did not advance			
Renier Mora Jimenez	Boys’ K1 sprint	1:33.65	8	Moltaev (KGZ); W 1:34.20-1:39.17		Silva (POR); W 1:33.65-1:34.04	Liebscher (GER); L 1:35.15-1:30.09	Did not advance		

== Diving ==
Boys

Athlete	Event	Preliminary		Final	
Athlete	Event	Points	Rank	Points	Rank
Abel Ramírez Téllez	Boys’ 3m Springboard	503.75	6 Q	543.15	5

== Fencing ==
Group Stage

Athlete	Event	Match 1	Match 2	Match 3	Match 4	Match 5	Match 6	Seed
Redys Prades Rosabal	Boys’ Foil	Massialas (USA); L 2-5	Choi (HKG); W 5-1	Choupenitch (CZE); L 2-5	Tsoronis (DEN); W 5-3	Babaoglu (TUR); L 3-5	Ong (SIN); L 2-5	10

Knock-Out Stage

Athlete	Event	Round of 16	Quarterfinals	Semifinals	Final	Rank
Redys Prades Rosabal	Boys’ Foil	Choupenitch (CZE); L 6-15	Did not advance			11
Americas 2 Maria Carreno (VEN); Guilherme Melaragno (BRA); Mona Shaito (USA); Miguel Breault-Mallette (CAN); Clara Isabel Di Tella (ARG); Redys Prades Rosabal (CUB)	Mixed Team	Africa; W 28-25	Europe 1 L 17-30	5th-8th Europe 3 L 23-30	7th-8th Asia-Oceania 2 W 28-27	7

== Gymnastics ==
=== Artistic gymnastics ===
Boys

Athlete	Event	Floor		Pommel horse		Rings		Vault		parallel bars		Horizontal bar		Total	
Athlete	Event	Score	Rank	Score	Rank	Score	Rank	Score	Rank	Score	Rank	Score	Rank	Score	Rank
Ernesto Vila Sarria	Boys' qualification	14.100	7 Q	13.400	14	12.700	30	15.650	9	14.050	6 Q	13.900	6 Q	83.800	7 Q
Ernesto Vila Sarria	Boys' individual all-around	13.550	11	12.300	14	13.100	16	15.700	5	14.100	4	13.450	9	82.200	7

Athlete	Event	Score	Rank
Ernesto Vila Sarria	Boys' floor	14.575	Gold medal
Ernesto Vila Sarria	Boys' parallel bars	12.975	7
Ernesto Vila Sarria	Boys' horizontal bar	13.975	6

== Judo ==
individual

Athlete	Event	Round 1	Round 2	Round 3	Semifinals	Final	Rank
Athlete	Event	Opposition Result	Opposition Result	Opposition Result	Opposition Result	Opposition Result	Rank
Alex Maxell García Mendoza	Boys' -100 kg	BYE	Mamistvalov (ISR); W 001-000		Igarashi (JPN); L 000-100	Bronze Medal Match; Toktogonov (KGZ); L 001-010	5

Team

Team	Event	Round 1	Round 2	Semifinals	Final	Rank
Team	Event	Opposition Result	Opposition Result	Opposition Result	Opposition Result	Rank
Essen; Lesly Cano (PER); Pedro Rivadulla (ESP); Andrea Krisandova (SVK); Kairat Agibayev (KAZ); Daryl Lokuku Ngambomo (COD); Miku Tashiro (JPN); Alex Maxell García Mendoza (CUB)	Mixed Team	Munich; W 4-3	Chiba; W 5-2	Cairo; W 5-2	Belgrade; W 6-1	Gold medal

== Modern pentathlon ==
Athlete	Event	Fencing (Épée One Touch)			Swimming (200m freestyle)			Running & Shooting (3000m, Laser Pistol)			Total Points	Final Rank
Athlete	Event	Results	Rank	Points	Time	Rank	Points	Time	Rank	Points	Total Points	Final Rank
Leydi Laura Moya Lopez	Girls' individual	12-11	10	840	2:25.25	7	1096	11:49.47	2	2164	4100	Gold medal
Leydi Laura Moya Lopez (CUB); Nathan Schrimsher (USA)	Mixed relay	38-54	20	740	2:03.98	7	1316	16:33.21	17	2108	4164	16

== Rowing ==
Athlete	Event	Heats		Repechage		Semifinals		Final		Overall Rank
Athlete	Event	Time	Rank	Time	Rank	Time	Rank	Time	Rank	Overall Rank
Ainee Hernandez Delgado	Girls' Single Sculls	3:46.93	1 QA/B			3:57.13	4 QB	3:49.13	1	7

== Sailing ==
One Person Dinghy

Athlete	Event	Race												Points	Rank
Athlete	Event	1	2	3	4	5	6	7	8	9	10	11	M*	Points	Rank
Lester Luis Hernandez Martinez	Boys' Byte CII	26	26	25	~~28~~	23	~~28~~	24	25	27	26	16	22	240	28
Sanlay Castro de la Cruz	Girls' Byte CII	24	22	22	23	25	19	19	18	~~30~~	16	~~28~~	22	210	24

== Taekwondo ==
Athlete	Event	Preliminary	Quarterfinal	Semifinal	Final	Rank
José Cobas	Boys' -55kg	BYE	Nursultan Mamayev (KAZ); L 0-2	Did not advance		5
Yuleimi Abreu	Girls' +63kg	BYE	Dasreen Primus (VIN); W RSC R1 0:35	Zheng Shuyin (CHN); L 2-8	Did not advance	Bronze medal

== Triathlon ==
Girls

Triathlete	Event	Swimming	Transit 1	Cycling	Transit 2	Running	Total time	Rank
Leslie Amat Álvarez	individual	10:01	0:33	33:57	0:26	22:18	1:07:15.28	22

Mixed

Athlete	Event	Total times per athlete (Swim 250 m, Bike 7 km, Run 1.7 km)	Total group time	Rank
Jessica Piedra (ECU); Carlos Pérez (VEN); Leslie Amat Álvarez (CUB); Iuri Vinuto (BRA)	Mixed team relay Americas 3	22:30; 19:53; 23:32; 20:39	1:26:34.25	11

== Volleyball ==
Squad List	Event	Group Stage		Semifinal	Final	Rank
Squad List	Event	Group B	Rank	Semifinal	Final	Rank
Wilfredo León; Alejandro González; Carlos Araujo; Juan Andrés León; Alexis Lamadrid (C); Yonder García; Yulian Durán; Dariel Albo; Nelson Loyola; Yassel Perdomo	Boys' Volleyball	Argentina; W 3-0 (25-22, 25-23, 25-23)	1 Q	Serbia; W 3-0 (25-22, 25-19, 25-22)	Argentina; W 3-1 (25-23, 25-21, 17-25, 25-20)	Gold medal
Wilfredo León; Alejandro González; Carlos Araujo; Juan Andrés León; Alexis Lamadrid (C); Yonder García; Yulian Durán; Dariel Albo; Nelson Loyola; Yassel Perdomo	Boys' Volleyball	Iran; W 3-1 (21-25, 25-22, 25-19, 25-22)	1 Q	Serbia; W 3-0 (25-22, 25-19, 25-22)	Argentina; W 3-1 (25-23, 25-21, 17-25, 25-20)	Gold medal

== Weightlifting ==
Athlete	Event	Snatch	Clean & Jerk	Total	Rank
Ediel Marquez Ona	Boys' 69kg	129	154	283	Bronze medal

== Wrestling ==
Freestyle

Athlete	Event	Pools		Final	Rank
Athlete	Event	Groups	Rank	Final	Rank
Abraham de Jesús Conyedo Ruano	Boys' 100kg	Dhesi (CAN); W 2–0 (1–0, 3–0)	1	Magomedabirov (AZE); L 0–2 (0–1, 0–1)	Silver medal
Abraham de Jesús Conyedo Ruano	Boys' 100kg	Kadian (IND); W 2–0 (1–0, 1–0)	1	Magomedabirov (AZE); L 0–2 (0–1, 0–1)	Silver medal
Abraham de Jesús Conyedo Ruano	Boys' 100kg	Schutte (RSA); W 2–0 (4–3, 1–0)	1	Magomedabirov (AZE); L 0–2 (0–1, 0–1)	Silver medal

Greco-Roman

Athlete	Event	Pools		Final	Rank
Athlete	Event	Groups	Rank	Final	Rank
Yosvanys Peña Flores	Boys' 42kg	Hussein (EGY); W 2–1 (0–1, 3–0, 1-0)	1	Bazarov (AZE); L 0–2 (0–2, 0–1)	Silver medal
Yosvanys Peña Flores	Boys' 42kg	Baimaganbetov (KAZ); W 2–1 (4–0, 0-3, 2–0)	1	Bazarov (AZE); L 0–2 (0–2, 0–1)	Silver medal
Yosvanys Peña Flores	Boys' 42kg	Khamseh (IRI); W 2–0 (1–0, 1–0)	1	Bazarov (AZE); L 0–2 (0–2, 0–1)	Silver medal
Johan Rodríguez Banguela	Boys' 50kg	Pikuza (BLR); W 2–0 (1–0, 3–0)	2	3rd Place Match; Sulaimanov (KGZ); L 1–2 (1–0, 0–1, 0-3)	4
Johan Rodríguez Banguela	Boys' 50kg	Makhtarov (AZE); L 0–2 (0–2, 1–5)	2	3rd Place Match; Sulaimanov (KGZ); L 1–2 (1–0, 0–1, 0-3)	4
