= Kim Dae-beom =

South Korean modern pentathlete (1992–2019)

Medal record

Men's modern pentathlon

Youth Olympic Games

Representing South Korea
Gold medal – first place	2010 Singapore	Individual

Representing a mixed-NOCs team
Silver medal – second place	2010 Singapore	Mixed team

Kim Dae-Beom (February 10, 1992 – April 15, 2019) was a South Korean modern pentathlete.

He won the surprising gold medal in the individual modern pentathlon at the inaugural 2010 Youth Olympics. Kim claimed victory with a total of 4,588 points. Ilya Shugarov of Russia came second with 4,568 points and Jorge Camacho of Mexico was third at 4,548 points.
