= Oleg Stepko =

Ukrainian, Azerbaijani, and Russian gymnast

- Олег Сергійович Степко
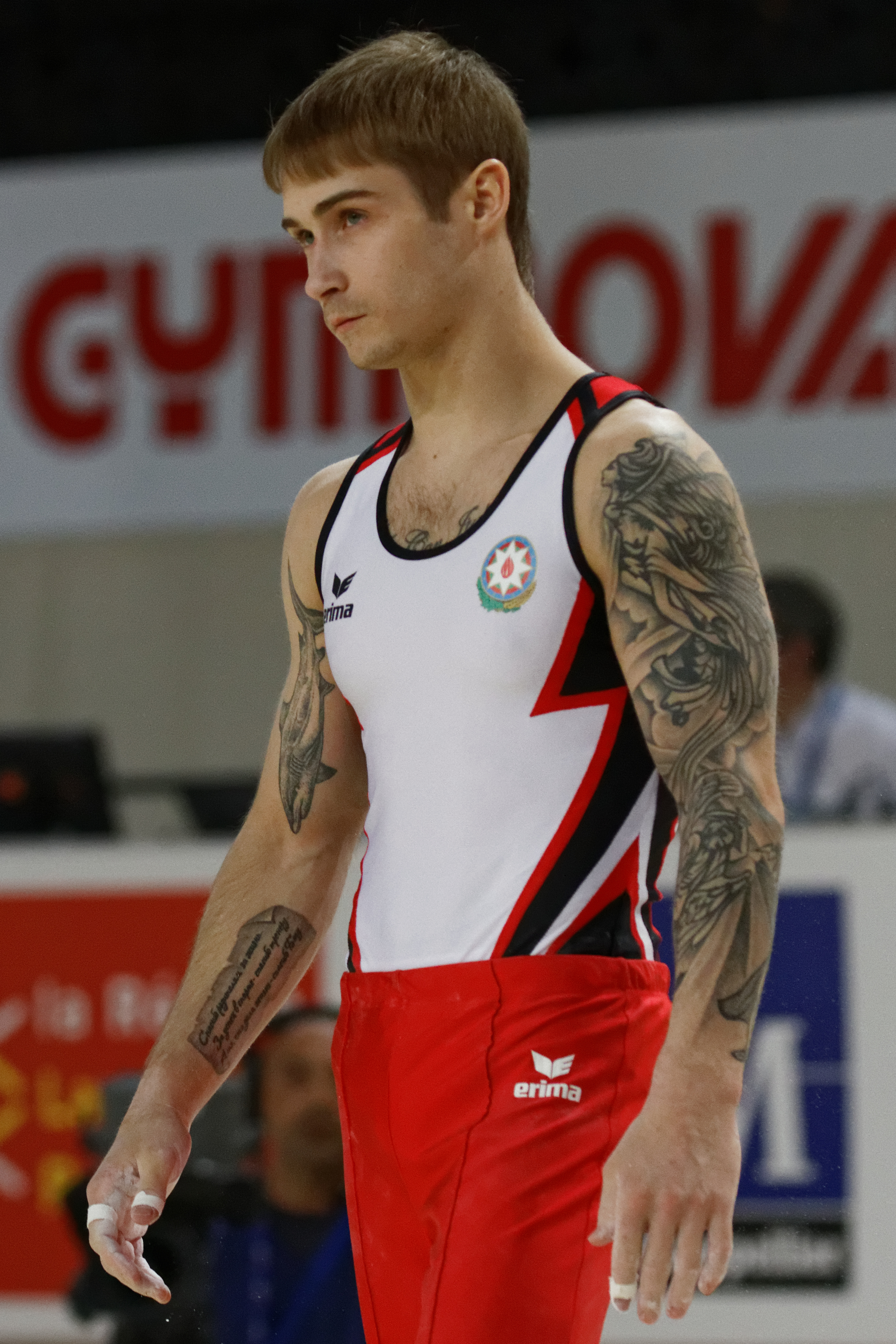
- Stepko at the 2015 European Championships.

Personal information
- Full name: Oleh Serhiyovych Stepko
- Alternative name: Oleq Stepko
- Born: 25 March 1994 (age 32) Zaporizhzhya, Ukraine
- Height: 5 ft 3 in (160 cm)

Gymnastics career
- Discipline: Men's artistic gymnastics
- Country represented: Russia (2018–present)
- Former countries represented: Azerbaijan (2014–2018); Ukraine (2010–2014)
- Club: Ukraina, Zaporozhye, UKR
- Head coach: Pavlo Netreba
Medal record
Representing Azerbaijan
World Championships
Bronze medal – third place	2015 Glasgow	Parallel Bars
European Games
Gold medal – first place	2015 Baku	Parallel Bars
Silver medal – second place	2015 Baku	All-Around
Silver medal – second place	2015 Baku	Pommel Horse
Bronze medal – third place	2015 Baku	Team
Bronze medal – third place	2015 Baku	Vault
Representing Ukraine
European Championships
Gold medal – first place	2013 Moscow	Parallel Bars
Summer Universiade
Silver medal – second place	2013 Kazan	Team
Bronze medal – third place	2013 Kazan	Pommel Horse
Youth Olympic Games
Gold medal – first place	2010 Singapore	Pommel Horse
Gold medal – first place	2010 Singapore	Parallel Bars
Silver medal – second place	2010 Singapore	All-Around
Silver medal – second place	2010 Singapore	Floor Exercise

Oleh Serhiyovych Stepko (Ukrainian: Олег Сергійович Степко, born 25 March 1994 in Zaporizhzhya) is a Ukrainian (until 2014), Azerbaijani (2014–2018), and Russian (since March 2018) gymnast.

== Gymnastics career ==
Oleg competed for the Ukrainian national team at the 2012 Summer Olympics in the Men's artistic team all-around. His teammates for the event were Mykola Kuksenkov, Igor Radivilov, Vitalii Nakonechnyi and Oleg Verniaiev. Stepko also participated in floor exercises, horizontal bar, and rings.

He won gold in Parallel Bars at the 2013 European Championships. At the 2013 Summer Universiade in Kazan, Stepko along with the Ukrainian team (Oleg Vernyayev, Igor Radivilov, Petro Pakhnyuk and Maksym Semiankiv) placed second in the team final. He won the bronze medal in the Pommel horse final.

== See also ==
- Nationality changes in gymnastics
