= Zhu Wenjing =

Chinese Para alpine skier (born 2001)

Personal information
- Born: 12 July 2001 (age 25) Jiangsu, China

Sport
- Country: China
- Sport: Para alpine skiing
- Disability class: LW9-2
Medal record
Women's Para alpine skiing
Representing China
Paralympic Games
Silver medal – second place	2026 Milano Cortina	Slalom standing
Bronze medal – third place	2026 Milano Cortina	Super combined standing

Zhu Wenjing (born 12 July 2001) is a Chinese Para alpine skier. She represented China at the 2026 Winter Paralympics.

== Career ==
In February 2026, she was selected to represent China at the 2026 Winter Paralympics. She won a bronze medal in the super combined standing event with a time of 2:10.69.
