= Gymnastics at the 2010 Summer Youth Olympics =

Gymnastics at the I Summer Youth Olympic Games
- Venue: Bishan Sports Hall
- Dates: 16 – 25 August 2010
- No. of events: 16 (8 boys, 8 girls)

The gymnastics competition of the 2010 Summer Youth Olympics in Singapore took place at the Bishan Sports Hall. There were events in artistic, rhythmic, and trampoline gymnastics.

== Competition schedule ==
=== Artistic gymnastics ===
Event date	Event day	Starting time	Event details
18 August	Wednesday	18:00	Boys' individual all-around
19 August	Thursday	18:00	Girls' individual all-around
21 August	Saturday	18:00	Boys' floor exercise
21 August	Saturday	18:50	Girls' vault
21 August	Saturday	19:25	Boys' pommel horse
21 August	Saturday	20:25	Girls' uneven bars
21 August	Saturday	20:55	Boys' rings
22 August	Sunday	18:00	Boys' vault
22 August	Sunday	18:50	Girls' beam
22 August	Sunday	19:25	Boys' parallel bars
22 August	Sunday	20:25	Girls' floor exercise
22 August	Sunday	20:55	Boys' horizontal bar

=== Rhythmic gymnastics ===
Event date	Event day	Starting time	Event details
25 August	Wednesday	14:45	Individual all-around
25 August	Wednesday	18:20	Group all-around

=== Trampoline gymnastics ===
Event date	Event day	Starting time	Event details
20 August	Friday	14:40	Girls' final
20 August	Friday	19:10	Boys' Final

== Medal summary ==
=== Artistic gymnastics ===
==== Boys' events ====
Games	Gold	Silver	Bronze
All-around	Yuya Kamoto; Japan	Oleg Stepko; Ukraine	Zhu Xiaodong; China
Floor exercise	Ernesto Vila Sarría; Cuba	Oleg Stepko; Ukraine	Zhu Xiaodong; China
Pommel horse	Oleg Stepko; Ukraine	Sam Oldham; Great Britain	Daniil Kazachkov; Russia
Rings	Andrei Muntean; Romania	Yuya Kamoto; Japan	Néstor Abad; Spain
Vault	Ganbatyn Erdenebold; Mongolia	Ferhat Arıcan; Turkey	Néstor Abad; Spain
Parallel bars	Oleg Stepko; Ukraine	Andrei Muntean; Romania	Ludovico Edalli; Italy
Horizontal bar	Sam Oldham; Great Britain	Néstor Abad; Spain	Zhu Xiaodong; China

==== Girls' events ====
Games	Gold	Silver	Bronze
All-around	Viktoria Komova; Russia	Tan Sixin; China	Carlotta Ferlito; Italy
Vault	Viktoria Komova; Russia	Maria Vargas; Spain	Carlotta Ferlito; Italy
Uneven bars	Viktoria Komova; Russia	Tan Sixin; China	Jonna Adlerteg; Sweden
Balance beam	Tan Sixin; China	Carlotta Ferlito; Italy	Angela Donald; Australia
Floor exercise	Tan Sixin; China	Diana Bulimar; Romania	Viktoria Komova; Russia

=== Rhythmic gymnastics ===
Games	Gold	Silver	Bronze
Individual all-around	Alexandra Merkulova; Russia	Arina Charopa; Belarus	Jana Berezko-Marggrander; Germany
Group all-around	Russia; Ksenia Dudkina; Alina Makarenko; Karolina Sevastyanova; Olga Ilina	Egypt; Farida Sherif Eid; Jacinthe Tarek Eldeeb; Manar Khaled Mohamed Elgarf; Aicha Mohamed Tarek Niazi	Canada; Katrina Cameron; Melodie Omidi; Anjelika Reznik; Victoria Reznik

=== Trampoline gymnastics ===
Games	Gold	Silver	Bronze
Boys' individual	Oleksandr Satin; Ukraine	He Yuxiang; China	Ginga Munetomo; Japan
Girls' individual	Dong Yu; China	Sviatlana Makshtrova; Belarus	Chisato Doihata; Japan

=== Medal table ===
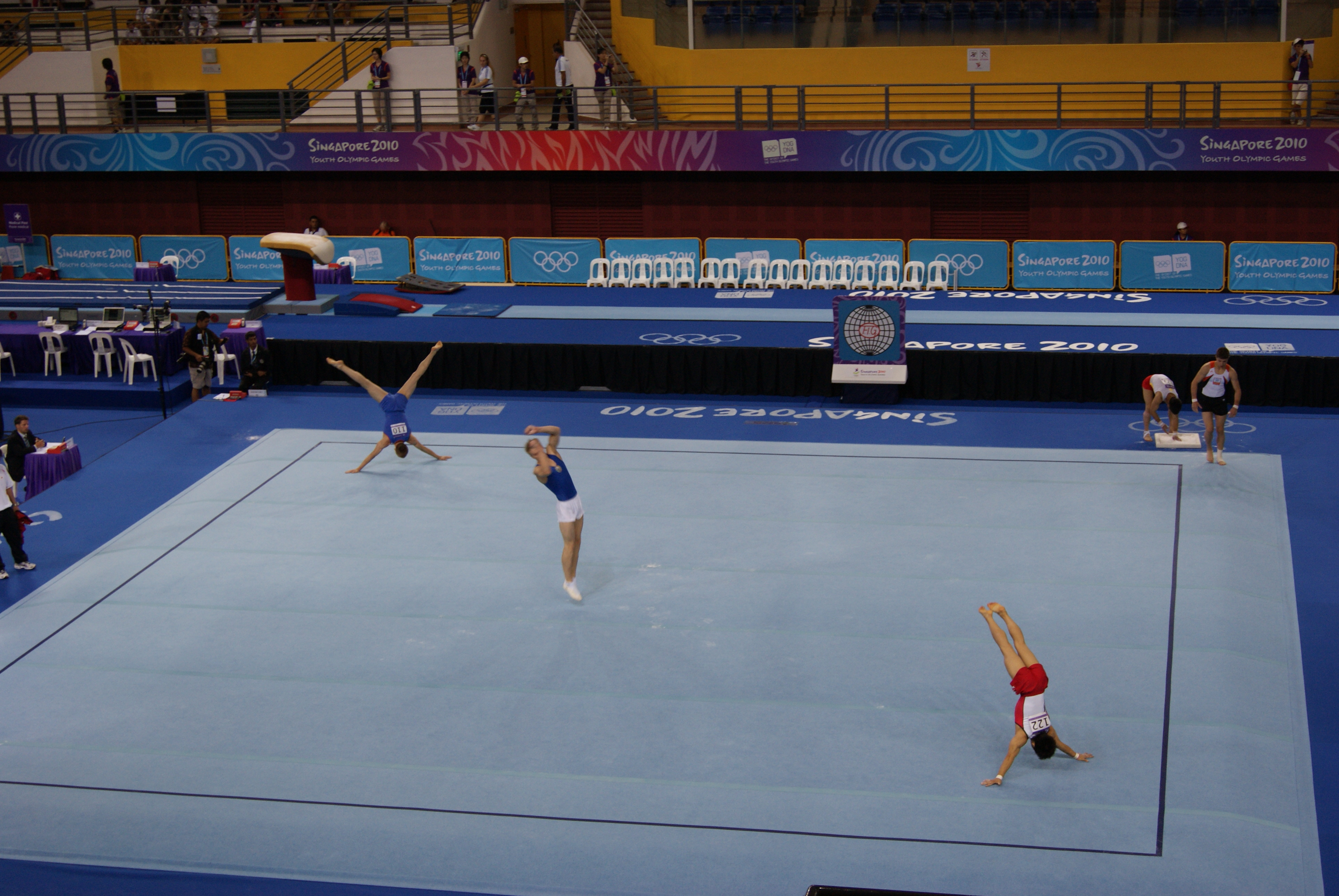
Male competitors practising floor exercises

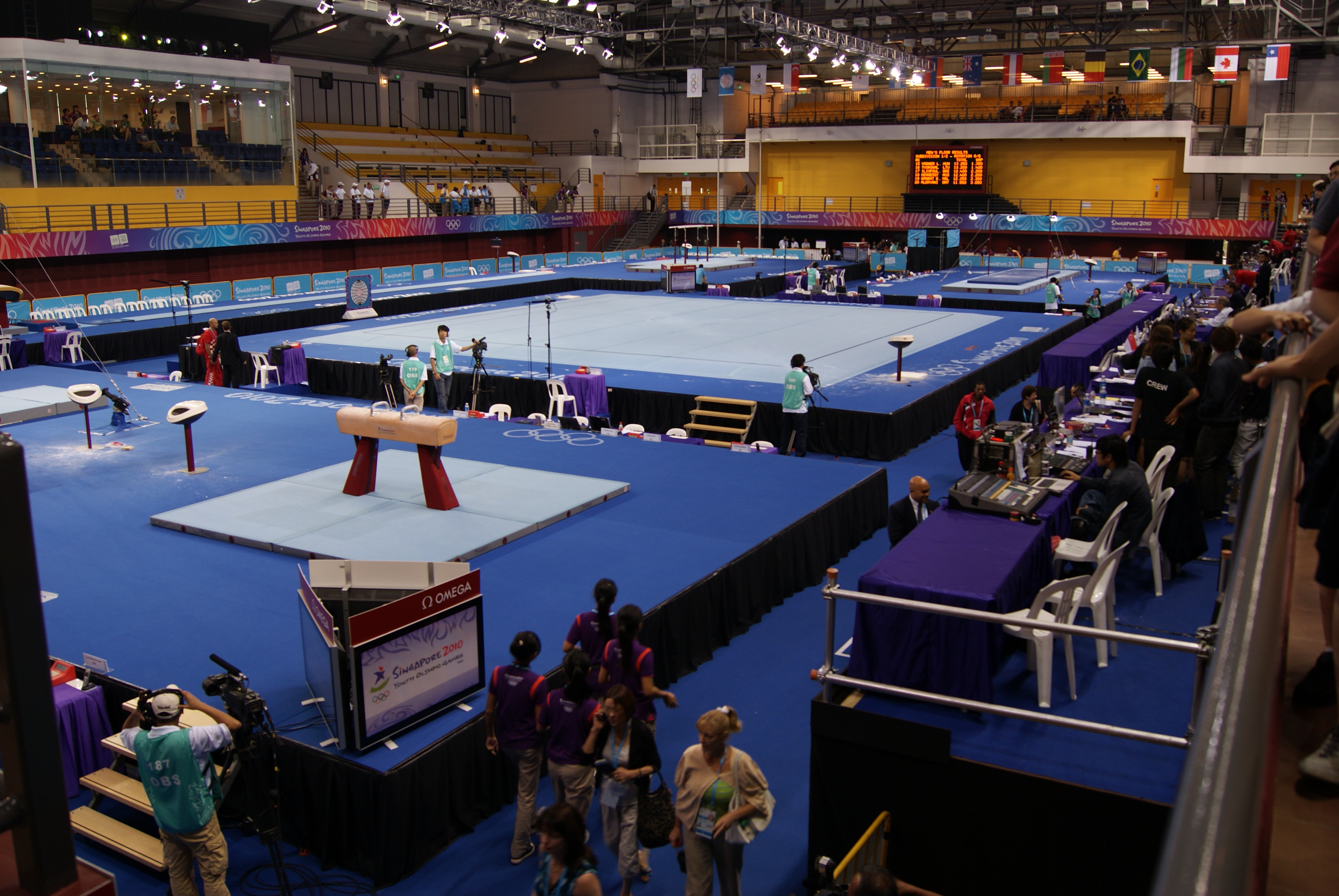
Bishan Sports Hall set up for the gymnastics competitions

Rank	Nation	Gold	Silver	Bronze	Total
1	Russia	5	0	2	7
2	China	3	3	3	9
3	Ukraine	3	2	0	5
4	Romania	1	2	0	3
5	Japan	1	1	2	4
6	Great Britain	1	1	0	2
7	Cuba	1	0	0	1
7	Mongolia	1	0	0	1
9	Spain	0	2	2	4
10	Belarus	0	2	0	2
11	Italy	0	1	3	4
12	Egypt	0	1	0	1
12	Turkey	0	1	0	1
14	Australia	0	0	1	1
14	Canada	0	0	1	1
14	Germany	0	0	1	1
14	Sweden	0	0	1	1
Totals (17 entries)		16	16	16	48
