= Anastasiya Spas =

Ukrainian modern pentathlete

Personal information
- Nationality: Ukrainian
- Born: 6 August 1993 (age 31)

Sport
- Country: Ukraine
- Sport: Modern pentathlon

Anastasiya Yuriyivna Spas (Ukrainian: Анастасія Юріївна Спас; born 6 August 1993) is a Ukrainian modern pentathlete. She has qualified for the 2016 Summer Olympics.
