= Swimming at the 2010 Summer Youth Olympics =

Swimming at the I Summer Youth Olympic Games
- Pictogram used for Aquatics, with diving (left) and swimming (right) represented.
- Venue: Singapore Sports School
- Dates: 15–20 August
- No. of events: 34 (16 boys, 16 girls, 2 mixed)
- Competitors: 390 from 153 nations

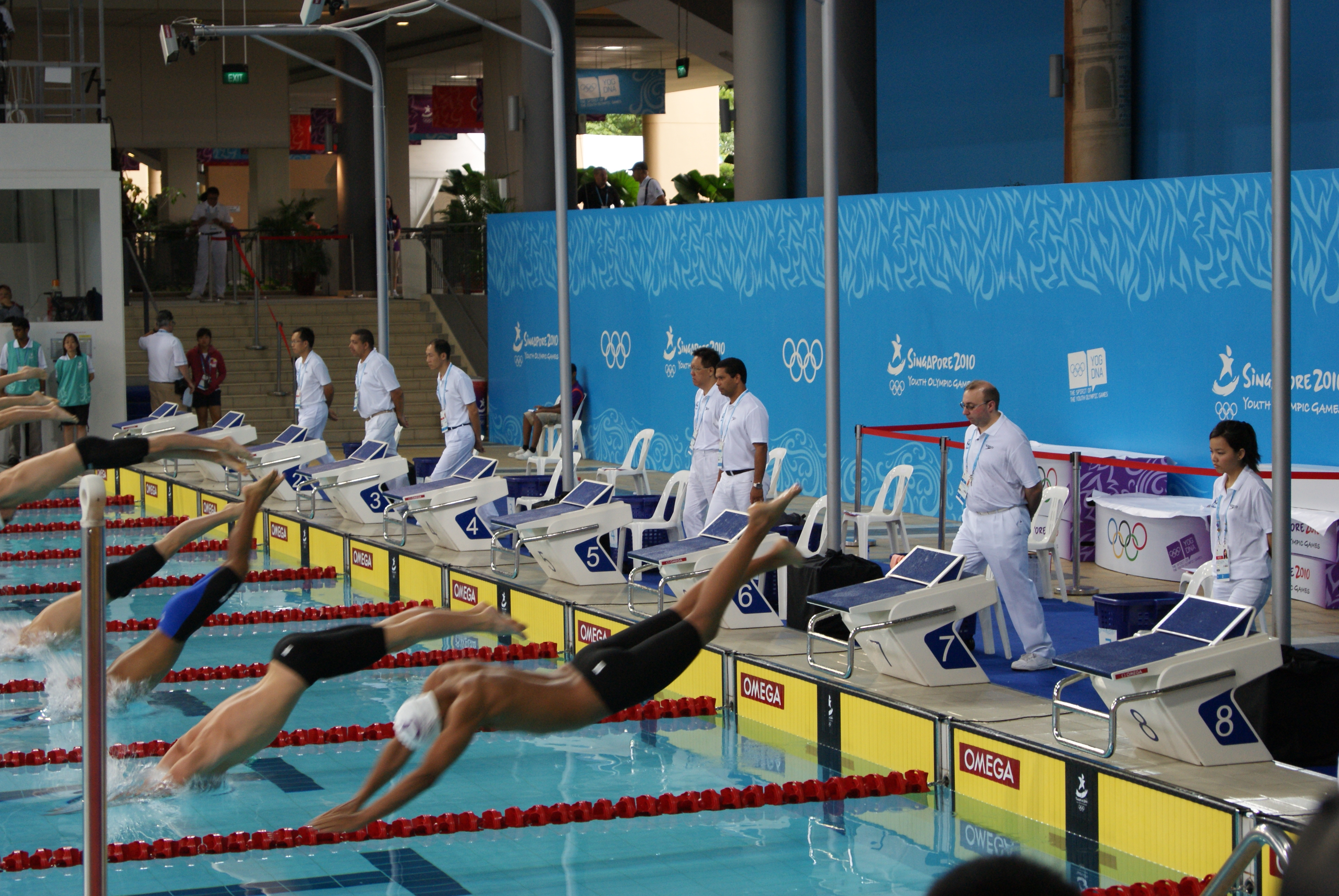
A boys' event at the 2010 Summer Youth Olympics, held at the Singapore Sports School swimming complex on 20 August

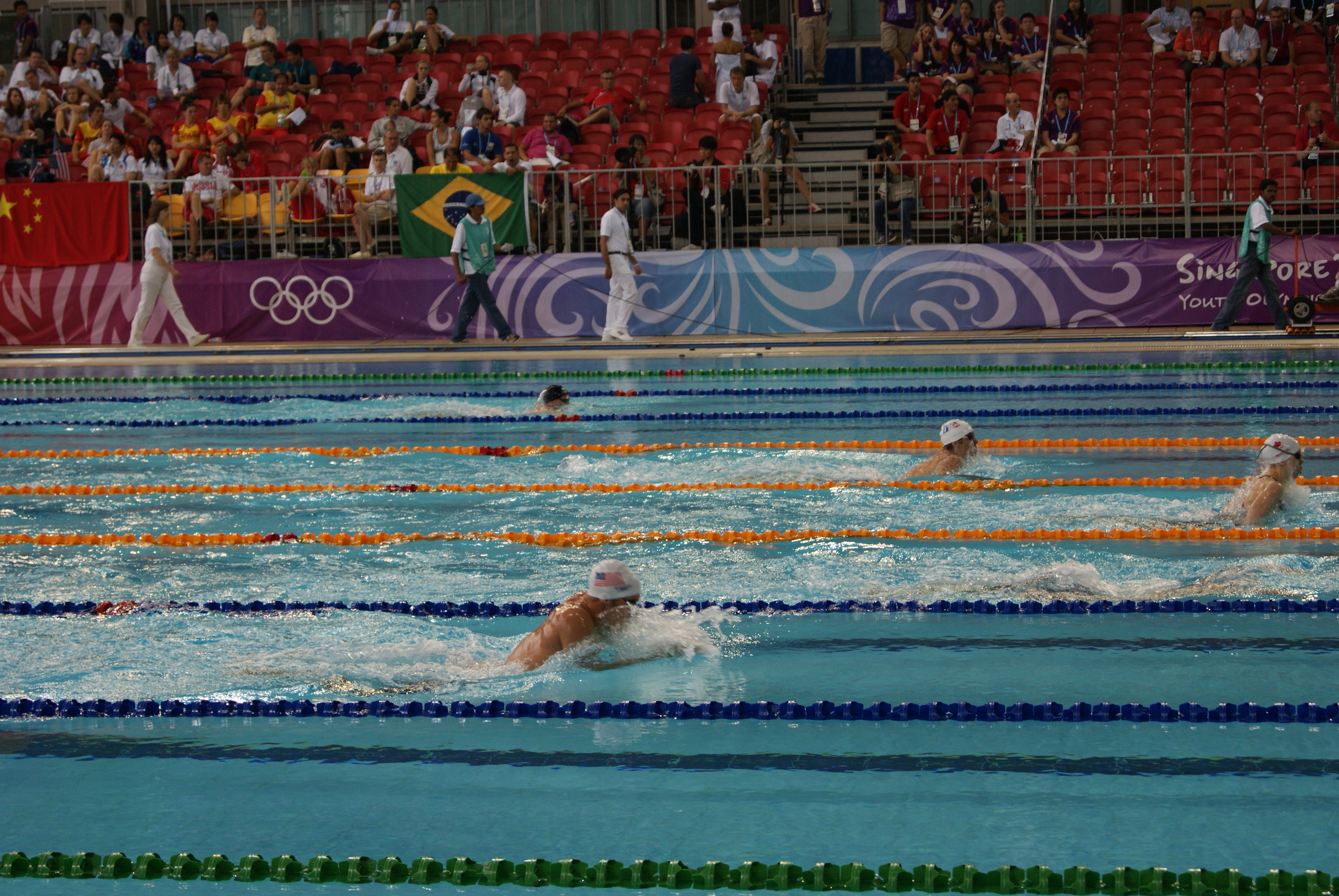
A swimming event in progress

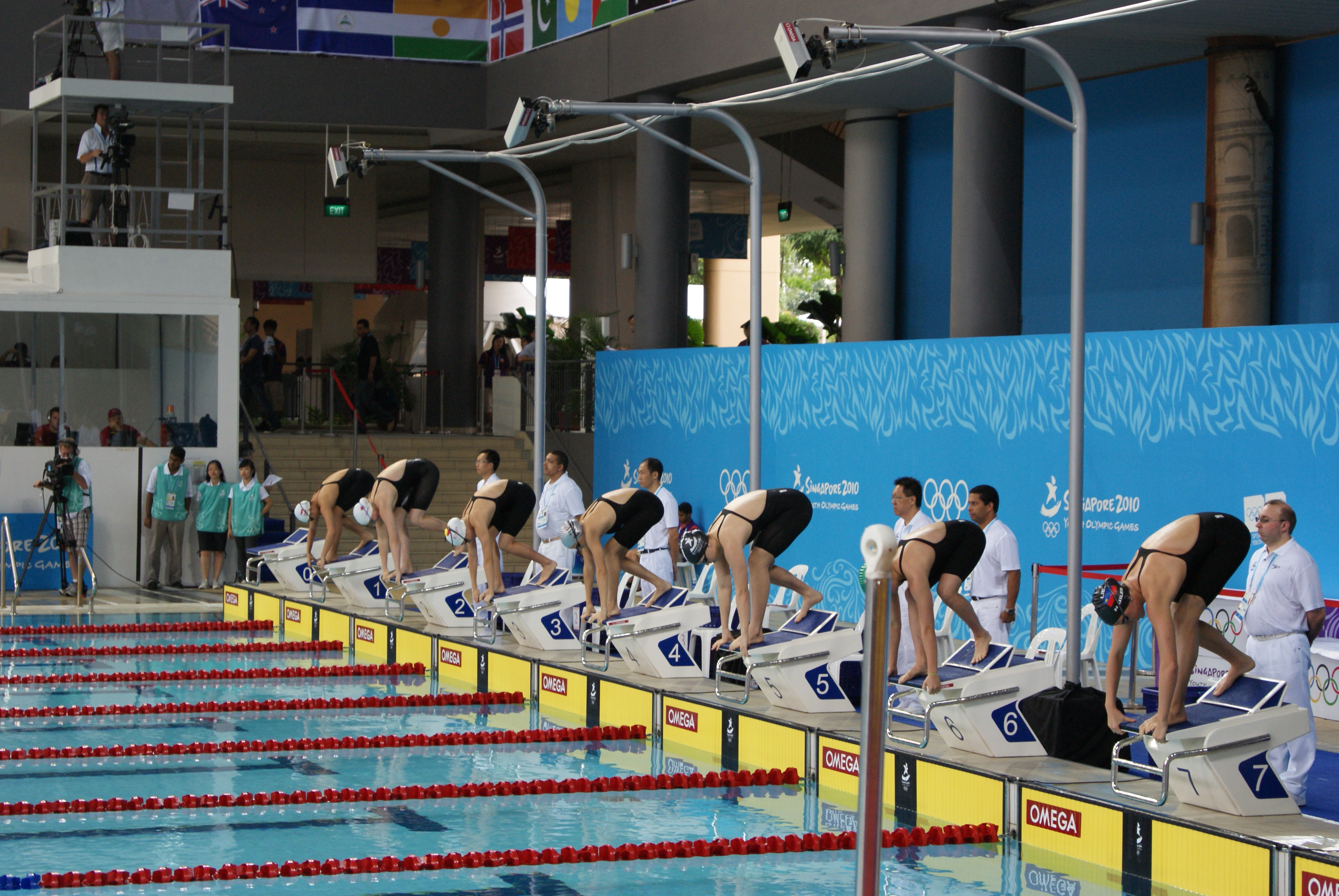
A girls' event about to begin

The Swimming competition at the 2010 Summer Youth Olympics lasted from August 15 to 20, at the Singapore Sports School.

== Competition schedule ==
=== Day 1 ===
Event date	Event day	Starting time	Event details
15 August	Sunday	18:32	Boys' 400 m Freestyle
15 August	Sunday	19:10	Girls' 200 m Individual Medley
15 August	Sunday	19:16	4 × 100 m Freestyle Mix

=== Day 2 ===
Event date	Event day	Starting time	Event details
16 August	Monday	18:32	Boys' 100 m Backstroke
16 August	Monday	18:36	Girls' 200 m Butterfly
16 August	Monday	18:41	Boys' 200 m Freestyle
16 August	Monday	18:46	Girls' 50 m Breaststroke
16 August	Monday	19:38	Boys' 100 m Breaststroke
16 August	Monday	19:42	Girls' 100 m Backstroke
16 August	Monday	19:46	Boys' 200 m Individual Medley
16 August	Monday	20:08	Girls' 4 × 100 m Medley

=== Day 3 ===
Event date	Event day	Starting time	Event details
17 August	Tuesday	18:45	Girls' 200 m Backstroke
17 August	Tuesday	18:50	Boys' 100 m Butterfly
17 August	Tuesday	19:28	Girls' 100 m Freestyle
17 August	Tuesday	19:32	Boys' 4 × 100 m Freestyle

=== Day 4 ===
Event date	Event day	Starting time	Event details
18 August	Wednesday	18:32	Boys' 50 m Freestyle
18 August	Wednesday	18:42	Boys' 200 m Breaststroke
18 August	Wednesday	18:57	Girls' 50 m Butterfly
18 August	Wednesday	19:00	Boys' 50 m Backstroke
18 August	Wednesday	19:04	Girls' 100 m Breaststroke
18 August	Wednesday	19:31	Girls' 200 m Freestyle
18 August	Wednesday	19:53	Boys' 4 × 100 m Medley

=== Day 5 ===
Event date	Event day	Starting time	Event details
19 August	Thursday	18:53	Boys' 50 m Butterfly
19 August	Thursday	18:57	Girls' 50 m Backstroke
19 August	Thursday	19:17	Girls' 4 × 100 m Freestyle

=== Day 6 ===
Event date	Event day	Starting time	Event details
20 August	Friday	18:32	Girls' 50 m Freestyle
20 August	Friday	18:36	Boys' 200 m Backstroke
20 August	Friday	18:42	Girls' 100 m Butterfly
20 August	Friday	18:55	Boys' 100 m Freestyle
20 August	Friday	19:00	Girls' 200 m Breaststroke
20 August	Friday	19:23	Boys' 200 m Butterfly
20 August	Friday	19:45	Girls' 400 m Freestyle Youth
20 August	Friday	20:01	Boys' 50 m Breaststroke
20 August	Friday	20:18	4 × 100 m Medley Mix

== Medal summary ==
=== Medal table ===
* Host nation (Singapore)

Rank	Nation	Gold	Silver	Bronze	Total
1	China	11	2	1	14
2	Australia	4	6	6	16
3	Hungary	4	1	1	6
4	France	3	1	2	6
5	Ukraine	3	1	1	5
6	Russia	2	5	2	9
7	Canada	2	1	4	7
8	South Africa	1	3	2	6
9	Italy	1	2	2	5
10	United States	1	2	0	3
11	South Korea	1	1	0	2
12	Croatia	1	0	0	1
12	Trinidad and Tobago	1	0	0	1
14	Spain	0	2	1	3
15	Israel	0	2	0	2
16	Germany	0	1	2	3
17	Serbia	0	1	1	2
17	Venezuela	0	1	1	2
19	Singapore*	0	1	0	1
20	Great Britain	0	0	2	2
21	Czech Republic	0	0	1	1
21	Japan	0	0	1	1
21	Kuwait	0	0	1	1
21	Norway	0	0	1	1
21	Poland	0	0	1	1
21	Portugal	0	0	1	1
21	Romania	0	0	1	1
Totals (27 entries)		35	33	35	103

=== Events ===
==== Boys' Events ====
Games	Gold		Silver		Bronze	
50m Freestyle	Andriy Hovorov; Ukraine	22.35	Kenneth To; Australia	22.82	Aitor Martínez; Spain	22.83
100m Freestyle	Mehdy Metella; France	49.99	Velimir Stjepanović; Serbia	50.25	Kenneth To; Australia	50.29
200m Freestyle	Andrey Ushakov; Russia	1:49.81	Cristian Quintero; Venezuela	1:49.98	Jeremy Bagshaw; Canada	1:50.67
400m Freestyle	Dai Jun; China	3:50.91	Chad le Clos; South Africa	3:51.37	Cristian Quintero; Venezuela	3:53.44
50m Backstroke	Christian Homer; Trinidad and Tobago	26.36	Rainer Ng; Singapore	26.45	Max Akerman; Australia Abdullah Al-Tuwaini; Kuwait	26.46
100m Backstroke	He Jianbin; China	55.16	Yakov Toumarkin; Israel	55.28	Lavrans Solli; Norway	56.20
200m Backstroke	Péter Bernek; Hungary	1:59.18	Yakov Toumarkin; Israel	1:59.39	Balázs Zámbó; Hungary	2:01.60
50m Breaststroke	Ivan Capan; Croatia	28.55	Nicholas Schafer; Australia	28.59	Razvan Tudosie; Romania	28.69
100m Breaststroke	Nicholas Schafer; Australia	1:01.38	Anton Lobanov; Russia	1:01.44	Flavio Bizzarri; Italy	1:02.22
200m Breaststroke	Flavio Bizzarri; Italy	2:13.31	Anton Lobanov; Russia	2:13.65	Nicholas Schafer; Australia	2:13.72
50m Butterfly	Andriy Hovorov; Ukraine	23.64	Chang Gyu-cheol; South Korea	24.05	Tommaso Romani; Italy	24.80
100m Butterfly	Chang Gyu-cheol; South Korea	53.13	Chad le Clos; South Africa	53.31	Velimir Stjepanović; Serbia	53.77
200m Butterfly	Bence Biczó; Hungary	1:55.89	Chad le Clos; South Africa	1:56.85	Marcin Cieślak; Poland	1:57.68
200m Medley	Chad le Clos; South Africa	2:00.68	Kenneth To; Australia	2:02.51	Dylan Bosch; South Africa	2:02.59
4 × 100 m Freestyle Relay	Russia; Andrey Ushakov; Alexey Atsapkin; Ilya Lemaev; Anton Lobanov	3:23.91	China; Sun Bowei; Dai Jun; Wang Ximing; He Jianbin	3:24.46	South Africa; Chad le Clos; Murray McDougall; Dylan Bosch; Pierre Keune	3:24.66
4 × 100 m Medley Relay	Australia; Max Ackerman; Nicholas Schafer; Kenneth To; Justin James	3:42.50	France; Ganesh Pedurand; Thomas Rabeisen; Jordan Coelho; Medhy Metella	3:43.84	Germany; Christian Diener; Christian vom Lehn; Melvin Herrmann; Kevin Leithold	3:44.22

==== Girls' Events ====
Games	Gold		Silver		Bronze	
50m Freestyle	Tang Yi; China Anna Santamans; France	25.40			Emma McKeon; Australia	25.61
100m Freestyle	Tang Yi; China	54.46	Emma McKeon; Australia	55.37	Lauren Earp; Canada	56.59
200m Freestyle	Tang Yi; China	1:58.78	Boglárka Kapás; Hungary	2:00.99	Emma McKeon; Australia	2:01.18
400m Freestyle	Boglárka Kapás; Hungary	4:10.37	Kiera Janzen; United States	4:14.28	Ellie Faulkner; Great Britain	4:14.31
50m Backstroke	Mathilde Cini; France	29.19	Daryna Zevina; Ukraine	29.34	Alexandra Papusha; Russia	29.51
100m Backstroke	Daryna Zevina; Ukraine	1:01.51	Bai Anqi; China	1:01.97	Alexandra Papusha; Russia	1:02.15
200m Backstroke	Bai Anqi; China	2:11.46	Kaitlyn Jones; United States	2:12.20	Daryna Zevina; Ukraine	2:12.31
50m Breaststroke	Rachel Nicol; Canada	32.06	Martina Carraro; Italy	32.44	Ana Rodrigues; Portugal	32.49
100m Breaststroke	Tera van Beilen; Canada	1:08.95	Emily Selig; Australia	1:09.06	Rachel Nicol; Canada	1:09.18
200m Breaststroke	Emily Selig; Australia	2:27.78	Tera van Beilen; Canada	2:29.39	Maya Hamano; Japan	2:29.75
50m Butterfly	Liu Lan; China	26.97	Elena Di Liddo; Italy	27.06	Anna Santamans; France	27.31
100m Butterfly	Liu Lan; China	59.67	Judit Ignacio; Spain	1:00.07	Rachael Kelly; Great Britain	1:00.26
200m Butterfly	Boglárka Kapás; Hungary	2:08.72	Judit Ignacio; Spain	2:10.11	Liu Lan; China	2:11.94
200m Medley	Kaitlyn Jones; United States	2:14.53	Kristina Kochetkova; Russia	2:15.13	Barbora Závadová; Czech Republic	2:15.36
4 × 100 m Freestyle Relay	China; Liu Lan; Anqi Bai; Chang Wang; Tang Yi	3:46.64	Germany; Juliane Reinhold; Lena Kalla; Dörte Baumert; Lina Rathsack	3:49.02	Canada; Lindsay Delmar; Tera van Beilen; Rachel Nicol; Lauren Earp	3:49.12
4 × 100 m Medley Relay	Australia; Madison Wilson; Emily Selig; Zoe Johnson; Emma McKeon	4:09.68	Russia; Alexandra Papusha; Olga Detenyuk; Kristina Kochetkova; Ekaterina Andreeva	4:11.07	Germany; Dörte Baumert; Lina Rathsack; Lena Kalla; Juliane Reinhold	4:11.76

==== Mixed Events ====
Games	Gold		Silver		Bronze	
4 × 100 m Freestyle Relay	China; Sun Bowei (52.31); Tang Yi (54.14); Liu Lan (55.61); He Jianbin (49.28); Bai Anqi^{[a]}	3:31.34	Australia; Kenneth To (49.97); Emma McKeon (54.45); Madison Wilson (57.26); Justin James (50.01)	3:31.69	France; Mehdy Metella (49.96); Anna Santamans (57.31); Mathilde Cini (57.52); Jordan Coelho (51.11)	3:35.90
4 × 100 m Medley Relay	China; He Jianbin (55.41); Wang Ximing (1:03.65); Liu Lan (59.41); Tang Yi (54.05); Bai Anqi^{[a]} Sun Bowei^{[a]}	3:52.52	Russia; Alexandra Papusha (1:02.71); Anton Lobanov (1:01.53); Kristina Kochetkova (1:00.87); Andrey Ushakov (50.18); Alexey Atsapkin^{[a]} Ilya Lemaev^{[a]} Ekaterina Andreeva^{[a]}	3:55.29	Australia; Max Ackerman (58.08); Emily Selig (1:09.03); Kenneth To (54.05); Emma McKeon (54.47); Madison Wilson^{[a]} Nicholas Schafer^{[a]} Zoe Johnson^{[a]} Justin James^{[a]}	3:55.63

^{a} Swimmers who participated in the heats only and received medals.

== Participating nations ==
153 nations will participate in swimming.

- Albania (1)
- Algeria (2)
- American Samoa (1)
- Andorra (2)
- Angola (1)
- Antigua and Barbuda (1)
- Argentina (3)
- Armenia (2)
- Aruba (2)
- Australia (8)
- Austria (1)
- Bahamas (2)
- Bangladesh (3)
- Barbados (1)
- Belarus (2)
- Belgium (3)
- Bolivia (2)
- Bosnia and Herzegovina (1)
- Botswana (2)
- Brazil (8)
- Brunei (2)
- Bulgaria (2)
- Burkina Faso (1)
- Cambodia (1)
- Cameroon (2)
- Canada (8)
- Cayman Islands (2)
- Chile (1)
- China (8)
- Chinese Taipei (2)
- Colombia (3)
- Comoros (1)
- Cook Islands (2)
- Costa Rica (1)
- Croatia (4)
- Cyprus (2)
- Czech Republic (3)
- Djibouti (1)
- Ecuador (2)
- Egypt (2)
- Estonia (3)
- Ethiopia (2)
- Fiji (1)
- Finland (3)
- France (7)
- Federated States of Micronesia (2)
- Macedonia (3)
- Georgia (1)
- Germany (8)
- Ghana (2)
- Great Britain (2)
- Greece (3)
- Grenada (2)
- Guatemala (2)
- Guinea (1)
- Guyana (1)
- Honduras (2)
- Hong Kong (4)
- Hungary (8)
- Iceland (6)
- India (2)
- Indonesia (3)
- Iran (2)
- Iraq (1)
- Israel (3)
- Italy (8)
- Jamaica (2)
- Japan (8)
- Jordan (2)
- Kazakhstan (3)
- Kenya (2)
- North Korea (2)
- South Korea (3)
- Kuwait (1)
- Kyrgyzstan (2)
- Laos (1)
- Latvia (2)
- Lebanon (2)
- Lesotho (1)
- Liberia (3)
- Libya (1)
- Liechtenstein (2)
- Lithuania (3)
- Luxembourg (3)
- Madagascar (2)
- Malawi (1)
- Malaysia (2)
- Maldives (2)
- Malta (1)
- Marshall Islands (2)
- Mauritius (2)
- Mexico (1)
- Moldova (2)
- Monaco (1)
- Mongolia (2)
- Montenegro (1)
- Morocco (1)
- Mozambique (1)
- Namibia (1)
- Netherlands (2)
- Netherlands Antilles (2)
- New Zealand (3)
- Nicaragua (2)
- Niger (1)
- Norway (1)
- Pakistan (1)
- Palau (1)
- Palestine (2)
- Papua New Guinea (1)
- Paraguay (1)
- Peru (3)
- Philippines (2)
- Poland (4)
- Portugal (4)
- Puerto Rico (2)
- Qatar (1)
- Romania (4)
- Russia (8)
- Rwanda (1)
- Samoa (1)
- Saudi Arabia (1)
- Senegal (2)
- Serbia (5)
- Seychelles (1)
- Singapore (8)
- Slovakia (4)
- Slovenia (4)
- South Africa (8)
- Spain (8)
- Sri Lanka (2)
- Saint Lucia (2)
- Suriname (2)
- Swaziland (1)
- Sweden (4)
- Switzerland (3)
- Syria (1)
- Tanzania (2)
- Thailand (2)
- Togo (1)
- Trinidad and Tobago (4)
- Tunisia (4)
- Turkey (2)
- Turkmenistan (1)
- Uganda (1)
- Ukraine (3)
- United States (8)
- Uruguay (2)
- Uzbekistan (2)
- Venezuela (4)
- Vietnam (3)
- Virgin Islands (1)
- Yemen (1)
- Zambia (1)
