= Swimming at the 2010 Summer Youth Olympics – Girls' 200 metre breaststroke =

The women's 200 metre breaststroke heats and semifinals at the 2010 Youth Olympic Games took place on August 20 at the Singapore Sports School.

== Medalists ==
Gold	Emily Selig; Australia	2:27.78
Silver	Tera van Beilen; Canada	2:29.39
Bronze	Maya Hamano; Japan	2:29.75

== Heats ==
=== Heat 1 ===
Rank	Lane	Name	Nationality	Time	Notes
1	4	Urtė Kazakevičiūtė	Lithuania	2:35.68	Q
2	5	Maria Georgia Michalaka	Greece	2:37.11	
3	2	Mijal Asis	Argentina	2:41.59	
4	6	Yvette Man-Yi Kong	Hong Kong	2:42.03	
5	3	Martina Carraro	Italy	2:43.91	
6	7	Nibal Yamout	Lebanon	2:46.96	
7	1	Ekaterina Lysenko	Kyrgyzstan	3:01.50	

=== Heat 2 ===
Rank	Lane	Name	Nationality	Time	Notes
1	2	Rachel Nicol	Canada	2:31.57	Q
2	3	Tera van Beilen	Canada	2:32.20	Q
3	5	Teresa Gutierrez	Spain	2:32.42	Q
4	4	Olga Detenyuk	Russia	2:33.30	Q
5	6	Lena Rathsack	Germany	2:37.75	
6	1	Taryn Mackenzie	South Africa	2:39.33	
7	7	Ana da Pinho Rodrigues	Portugal	2:46.84	

=== Heat 3 ===
Rank	Lane	Name	Nationality	Time	Notes
1	3	Emily Selig	Australia	2:30.56	Q
2	6	Maya Hamano	Japan	2:31.67	Q
3	2	Jolien Vermeylen	Belgium	2:35.13	Q
4	1	Aurelie Waltzing	Luxembourg	2:37.19	
5	5	Noora Laukkanen	Finland	2:37.46	
6	7	Cheryl Lim	Singapore	2:40.23	

== Final ==
Rank	Lane	Name	Nationality	Time	Notes
1st place, gold medalist(s)	4	Emily Selig	Australia	2:27.78	
2nd place, silver medalist(s)	6	Tera van Beilen	Canada	2:29.39	
3rd place, bronze medalist(s)	3	Maya Hamano	Japan	2:29.75	
4	5	Rachel Nicol	Canada	2:29.87	
5	2	Teresa Gutierrez	Spain	2:31.06	
6	7	Olga Detenyuk	Russia	2:34.15	
7	1	Jolien Vermeylen	Belgium	2:34.20	
8	8	Urtė Kazakevičiūtė	Lithuania	2:37.33	
