= Swimming at the 2010 Summer Youth Olympics – Girls' 100 metre breaststroke =

The women's 100 metre breaststroke heats and semifinals at the 2010 Youth Olympic Games took place on August 17 with the final on August 18 at the Singapore Sports School.

== Medalists ==
Gold	Tera van Beilen; Canada	1:08.59
Silver	Emily Selig; Australia	1:09.06
Bronze	Rachel Nicol; Canada	1:09.18

== Heats ==
=== Heat 1 ===
Rank	Lane	Name	Nationality	Time	Notes
1	4	Brigitte Rasmussen	Virgin Islands	1:20.38	
2	3	Mariana Henriques	Angola	1:26.96	
3	5	Maimouna Boubacar Badie	Niger		DNS

=== Heat 2 ===
Rank	Lane	Name	Nationality	Time	Notes
1	2	Taryn Mackenzie	South Africa	1:13.46	Q
2	5	Aurelie Waltzing	Luxembourg	1:14.11	
3	3	Yin Jing Cheryl Lim	Singapore	1:14.38	
4	4	Mijal Asis	Argentina	1:14.54	
5	7	Katarina Đurđević	Montenegro	1:18.21	
6	6	Kum Jong Ho	North Korea		DNS

=== Heat 3 ===
Rank	Lane	Name	Nationality	Time	Notes
1	7	Emily Selig	Australia	1:10.57	Q
2	3	Noora Laukkanen	Finland	1:11.73	Q
3	5	Tina Meža	Slovenia	1:13.28	Q
4	4	Yvette Man-Yi Kong	Hong Kong	1:13.31	Q
5	2	Yuliya Litvina	Kazakhstan	1:13.55	
6	8	Jolien Vermeylen	Belgium	1:13.85	
7	6	Ana de Pinho Rodrigues	Portugal	1:15.31	
8	1	Carolina Bergamaschi	Brazil	1:16.42	

=== Heat 4 ===
Rank	Lane	Name	Nationality	Time	Notes
1	5	Tera van Beilen	Canada	1:11.24	Q
2	6	Maya Hamano	Japan	1:11.32	Q
3	3	Tjaša Vozelj	Slovenia	1:12.27	Q
4	1	Teresa Gutierrez	Spain	1:12.75	Q
5	2	Lina Rathsack	Germany	1:13.08	Q
6	4	Martina Carraro	Italy	1:13.09	Q
7	7	Evghenia Tanasienco	Moldova	1:14.47	
8	8	Aurelia Trnovcova	Slovakia	1:15.99	

=== Heat 5 ===
Rank	Lane	Name	Nationality	Time	Notes
1	6	Rachel Nicol	Canada	1:08.87	Q
2	5	Maria Georgia Michalaka	Greece	1:10.77	Q
3	7	Urtė Kazakevičiūtė	Lithuania	1:11.67	Q
4	3	Olga Detenyuk	Russia	1:12.68	Q
5	1	Chloe Francis	New Zealand	1:13.38	Q
6	2	Wang Chang	China	1:13.50	
7	8	Maria Carolina da Costa Rosa	Portugal	1:16.40	

== Semifinals ==
=== Semifinal 1 ===
Rank	Lane	Name	Nationality	Time	Notes
1	4	Emily Selig	Australia	1:09.84	Q
2	5	Tera van Beilen	Canada	1:09.93	Q
3	3	Urtė Kazakevičiūtė	Lithuania	1:11.63	Q
4	7	Martina Carraro	Italy	1:11.76	Q
5	6	Tjasa Vozel	Slovenia	1:12.28	
6	1	Yvette Man-Yi Kong	Hong Kong	1:12.67	
7	2	Teresa Gutierrez	Spain	1:13.15	
8	8	Taryn Mackenzie	South Africa	1:13.46	

=== Semifinal 2 ===
Rank	Lane	Name	Nationality	Time	Notes
1	4	Rachel Nicol	Canada	1:09.22	Q
2	5	Maria Georgia Michalaka	Greece	1:10.55	Q
3	3	Maya Hamano	Japan	1:10.91	Q
4	6	Noora Laukkanen	Finland	1:11.75	Q
5	7	Lina Rathsack	Germany	1:12.03	
6	1	Tina Meža	Slovenia	1:12.33	
7	2	Olga Detenyuk	Russia	1:12.68	
8	8	Chloe Francis	New Zealand	1:13.03	

== Final ==
Rank	Lane	Name	Nationality	Time	Notes
1st place, gold medalist(s)	3	Tera van Beilen	Canada	1:08.59	
2nd place, silver medalist(s)	5	Emily Selig	Australia	1:09.06	
3rd place, bronze medalist(s)	4	Rachel Nicol	Canada	1:09.18	
4	2	Maya Hamano	Japan	1:10.18	
5	6	Maria Georgia Michalaka	Greece	1:10.41	
6	8	Martina Carraro	Italy	1:10.95	
7	1	Noora Laukkanen	Finland	1:11.39	
8	7	Urtė Kazakevičiūtė	Lithuania	1:11.63	
