= Russia at the 2010 Summer Youth Olympics =

- IOC code: RUS
- NOC: Russian Olympic Committee
- Website: www.olympic.ru (in Russian and English)

in Singapore
- Competitors: 96 in 20 sports
- Flag bearer: Igor Kalashnikov
- Medals Ranked 2nd: Gold 18 Silver 14 Bronze 11 Total 43

Summer Youth Olympics appearances (overview)
- 2010; 2014; 2018

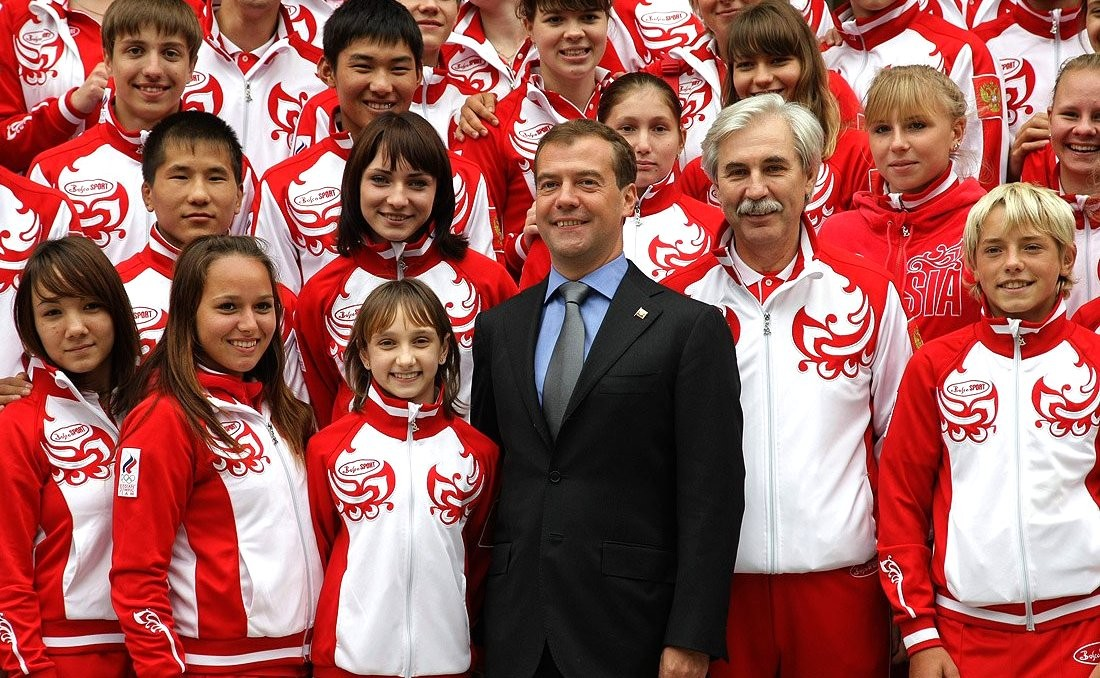
Dmitry Medvedev, the President of Russia, greets the medalists

Russia participated at the 2010 Summer Youth Olympics in Singapore. The Russian team consisted of 96 athletes competing in 20 sports: aquatics (swimming), archery, athletics, basketball, boxing, canoeing, fencing, gymnastics, handball, judo, modern pentathlon, rowing, sailing, shooting, table tennis, taekwondo, tennis, volleyball, weightlifting and wrestling. Viktoria Komova won most medals, with 3 gold medals and 1 bronze medal.

== Medalists ==
Medals awarded to participants of mixed-NOC teams are represented in italics. These medals are not counted towards the individual NOC medal tally.

| Medal | Name | Sport | Event | Date |
|---|---|---|---|---|
| Gold | Anastasia Valueva | Taekwondo | Women's 44kg | 15 Aug |
| Gold | Ruslan Adzhigov | Wrestling | Men's Greco-Roman 85kg | 15 Aug |
| Gold | Yana Egoryan | Fencing | Cadet female sabre | 16 Aug |
| Gold | Andrey Ushakov | Swimming | Youth men's 200m freestyle | 16 Aug |
| Gold | Andrey Ushakov; Alexey Atsapkin; Ilya Lemaev; Anton Lobanov | Swimming | Youth men's 4 × 100 m freestyle relay | 17 Aug |
| Gold | Aldar Balzhinimaev | Wrestling | Men's freestyle 46kg | 17 Aug |
| Gold | Azamatbi Pshnatlov | Wrestling | Men's freestyle 63kg | 17 Aug |
| Gold | Yana Egoryan | Fencing | Mixed team | 18 Aug |
| Gold | Artem Okulov | Weightlifting | Men's 77kg | 18 Aug |
| Gold | Olga Zubova | Weightlifting | Women's +63kg | 18 Aug |
| Gold | Viktoria Komova | Gymnastics | Girls' all-around | 19 Aug |
| Gold | Daria Gavrilova | Tennis | Women's singles | 20 Aug |
| Gold | Ekaterina Bleskina | Athletics | Girls' 100m hurdles | 21 Aug |
| Gold | Viktoria Komova | Gymnastics | Girls' vault | 21 Aug |
| Gold | Viktoria Komova | Gymnastics | Girls' uneven bars | 21 Aug |
| Gold | Natalia Troneva | Athletics | Girls' shot put | 22 Aug |
| Gold | Maria Kuchina | Athletics | Girls' high jump | 22 Aug |
| Gold | Ilya Shugarov | Modern Pentathlon | Mixed relay | 24 Aug |
| Gold | Alexandra Merkulova | Gymnastics | Girls' rhythmic individual all-around | 25 Aug |
| Gold | Ksenia Dudkina; Olga Ilyina; Karolina Sevastyanova; Alina Makarenko | Gymnastics | Girls' rhythmic group all-around | 25 Aug |
| Silver | Victoria Alekseeva | Fencing | Cadet Female foil | 15 Aug |
| Silver | Kristina Kochetkova | Swimming | Youth women's 200m medley | 15 Aug |
| Silver | Alexandra Papusha; Olga Detenyuk; Kristina Kochetkova; Ekaterina Andreeva | Swimming | Youth women's 4 × 100 m medley relay | 16 Aug |
| Silver | Anton Lobanov | Swimming | Youth men's 100m breaststroke | 16 Aug |
| Silver | Diana Akhmetova | Weightlifting | Women's 63kg | 17 Aug |
| Silver | Victoria Alekseeva | Fencing | Mixed team | 18 Aug |
| Silver | Anton Lobanov | Swimming | Youth men's 200m breaststroke | 18 Aug |
| Silver | Aliaskhab Sirazhov | Taekwondo | Men's 73kg | 18 Aug |
| Silver | Alexey Kosov | Weightlifting | Men's 85kg | 18 Aug |
| Silver | Alexandra Papusha; Anton Lobanov; Kristina Kochetkova; Andrey Ushakov | Swimming | Mixed 4 × 100 m medley relay | 20 Aug |
| Silver | Victor Baluda; Mikhail Biryukov | Tennis | Men's doubles | 21 Aug |
| Silver | Nikita Uglov | Athletics | Boys' medley relay | 23 Aug |
| Silver | Anna Dmitrieva | Judo | Women's 52kg | 22 Aug |
| Silver | Khasan Khalmurzaev | Judo | Men's 81kg | 22 Aug |
| Silver | Ilya Shugarov | Modern Pentathlon | Boys' individual | 22 Aug |
| Silver | Girls' Handball Team: Daria Vakhterova; Irina Zagaynova; Tamara Chopikyan; Nadezhda Koroleva; Anna Shukalova; Ksenia Milova; Veronika Garanina; Oxana Korobkova; Natalia Anisimova; Oxana Kondrashina; Natalia Danshina; Nadezhda Pastukh; Victoria Divak; Ekaterina Chernobrovina | Handball | Women's tournament | 25 Aug |
| Silver | Anna Dmitrieva | Judo | Mixed team | 25 Aug |
| Bronze | Artur Suleymanov | Wrestling | Men's Greco-Roman 58kg | 15 Aug |
| Bronze | Alexandra Papusha | Swimming | Youth women's 100m backstroke | 16 Aug |
| Bronze | Svetlana Lipatova | Wrestling | Women's freestyle 60kg | 16 Aug |
| Bronze | Alexandra Papusha | Swimming | Youth women's 50m backstroke | 19 Aug |
| Bronze | Tatiana Segina | Archery | Junior women's individual | 20 Aug |
| Bronze | Bolot Tsybzhitov | Archery | Junior men's individual | 21 Aug |
| Bronze | Nadezhda Leontyeva | Athletics | Girls' 5 km walk | 21 Aug |
| Bronze | Daniil Kazachkov | Gymnastics | Boys' pommel horse | 21 Aug |
| Bronze | Pavel Parshin | Athletics | Boys' 10 km walk | 22 Aug |
| Bronze | Viktoria Komova | Gymnastics | Girls' floor exercise | 22 Aug |
| Bronze | Gulnaz Gubaydullina | Modern Pentathlon | Mixed relay | 24 Aug |
| Bronze | Boys' volleyball Team: Bogdan Glivenko; Valentin Golubev; Ivan Komarov; Maxim Kulikov; Vladmir Manerov; Filipp Mokievskiy; Ilya Nikitin; Konstantin Osipov; Alexander Shchurin; Dmitriy Solodilin; Alexey Tertyshnikov; Vadim Zolotikhin | Volleyball | Men's tournament | 25 Aug |

Medals by sport
| Sport | 1st place, gold medalist(s) | 2nd place, silver medalist(s) | 3rd place, bronze medalist(s) | Total |
| Gymnastics | 5 | 0 | 2 | 7 |
| Athletics | 3 | 0 | 2 | 5 |
| Wrestling | 3 | 0 | 2 | 5 |
| Swimming | 2 | 5 | 2 | 9 |
| Weightlifting | 2 | 2 | 0 | 4 |
| Fencing | 1 | 1 | 0 | 2 |
| Taekwondo | 1 | 1 | 0 | 2 |
| Tennis | 1 | 1 | 0 | 2 |
| Judo | 0 | 2 | 0 | 2 |
| Handball | 0 | 1 | 0 | 1 |
| Modern pentathlon | 0 | 1 | 0 | 1 |
| Archery | 0 | 0 | 2 | 2 |
| Volleyball | 0 | 0 | 1 | 1 |
| Total | 18 | 14 | 11 | 43 |

Medals by date
| Day | Date | 1st place, gold medalist(s) | 2nd place, silver medalist(s) | 3rd place, bronze medalist(s) | Total |
| Day 1 | 15 August | 2 | 2 | 1 | 5 |
| Day 2 | 16 August | 2 | 2 | 2 | 6 |
| Day 3 | 17 August | 3 | 1 | 0 | 4 |
| Day 4 | 18 August | 2 | 3 | 0 | 5 |
| Day 5 | 19 August | 1 | 0 | 1 | 2 |
| Day 6 | 20 August | 1 | 1 | 1 | 3 |
| Day 7 | 21 August | 3 | 1 | 3 | 7 |
| Day 8 | 22 August | 2 | 3 | 2 | 7 |
| Day 9 | 23 August | 0 | 0 | 0 | 0 |
| Day 10 | 24 August | 0 | 0 | 0 | 0 |
| Day 11 | 25 August | 2 | 1 | 1 | 4 |
| Day 12 | 26 August | 0 | 0 | 0 | 0 |
| Total | | 18 | 14 | 11 | 43 |

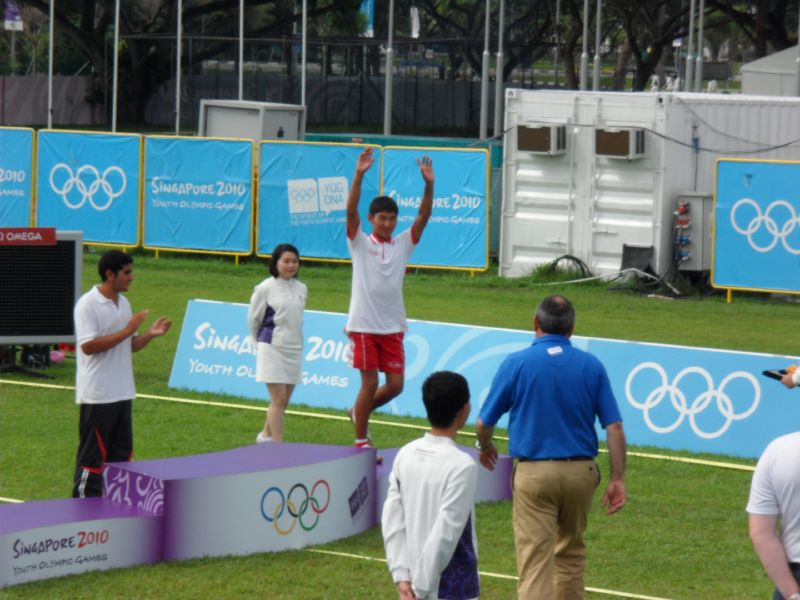
Bolot Tsybzhitov on the victory podium after winning the bronze medal in the Junior men's individual archery competition at Kallang Field, Singapore

== Archery ==
Boys

| Athlete | Event | Ranking round | | Round of 32 | Round of 16 | Quarterfinals | Semifinals | Final Bronze final | |
| Athlete | Event | Score | Seed | Opposition Score | Opposition Score | Opposition Score | Opposition Score | Opposition Score | Rank |
|---|---|---|---|---|---|---|---|---|---|
| Bolot Tsybzhitov | Boys' individual | 638 | 4 | Jaworski (POL) (29); W 6–0 | Hajduk (CZE) (20); W 6–0 | Milon (BAN) (12); W 6–0 | Oever (NED) (1); L 4–6 | Rajh (SLO) (6); W 6–0 | Bronze medal |

Girls

| Athlete | Event | Ranking round | | Round of 32 | Round of 16 | Quarterfinals | Semifinals | Final Bronze final | |
| Athlete | Event | Score | Seed | Opposition Score | Opposition Score | Opposition Score | Opposition Score | Opposition Score | Rank |
|---|---|---|---|---|---|---|---|---|---|
| Tatiana Segina | Girls' individual | 639 | 3 | Zainutdinova (TJK) (30); W 6–0 | Okubo (JPN) (19); W 6–4 | Viehmeier (GER) (11); W 6–0 | Tan (TPE) (2); L 2–6 | Avitia (MEX) (4); W 6–2 | Bronze medal |

Mixed

| Athlete | Event | Partner | Round of 32 | Round of 16 | Quarterfinals | Semifinals | Final | |
| Athlete | Event | Partner | Opposition Score | Opposition Score | Opposition Score | Opposition Score | Opposition Score | Rank |
|---|---|---|---|---|---|---|---|---|
| Bolot Tsybzhitov | Mixed team | Tanja Sorsa (FIN) | Lecointre (FRA)/ Müller (SUI); W 6–4 | Hul (BLR)/ Luo (CHN); L 5–6 | Did not advance | | | 9 |
| Tatiana Segina | Mixed team | Maciej Jaworski (POL) | Unsal (TUR)/ Jaffar (SIN); L 4–6 | Did not advance | | | | 17 |

== Athletics ==
=== Boys ===
Track and Road Events

| Athletes | Event | Qualification | | Final | |
| Athletes | Event | Result | Rank | Result | Rank |
|---|---|---|---|---|---|
| Nikita Uglov | Boys' 400m | 47.43 | 4 Q | 48.15 | 7 |
| Pavel Parshin | Boys' 10km walk | | | 44:18.04 | Bronze medal |
| David Bolarinwa (GBR); Tomasz Kluczynski (POL); Marco Lorenzi (ITA); Nikita Uglov (RUS) | Boys' medley relay | | | 1:52.11 | Silver medal |

Field Events

| Athletes | Event | Qualification | | Final | |
| Athletes | Event | Result | Rank | Result | Rank |
|---|---|---|---|---|---|
| Sergey Morgunov | Boys' long jump | 7.27 | 7 Q | 7.08 | 7 |

=== Girls ===
Track and Road Events

| Athletes | Event | Qualification | | Final | |
| Athletes | Event | Result | Rank | Result | Rank |
|---|---|---|---|---|---|
| Ekaterina Renzhina | Girls' 200m | 25.00 | 9 qB | 24.70 | 11 |
| Ekaterina Bleskina | Girls' 100m hurdles | 13.32 | 1 Q | 13.34 | Gold medal |
| Nadezda Leontyeva | Girls' 5km walk | | | 22:35.05 | Bronze medal |

Field Events

| Athletes | Event | Qualification | | Final | |
| Athletes | Event | Result | Rank | Result | Rank |
|---|---|---|---|---|---|
| Natalia Troneva | Girls' shot put | 15.06 | 3 Q | 15.66 | Gold medal |
| Victoria Sadova | Girls' discus throw | 45.37 | 5 Q | 44.60 | 7 |
| Maria Kuchina | Girls' high jump | 1.76 | 1 Q | 1.89 | Gold medal |
| Natalia Demidenko | Girls' pole vault | 3.90 | 4 Q | 3.65 | 6 |

== Basketball ==
Girls

| Squad list | Event | Group Stage | | Placement Stage | | | Rank |
| Squad list | Event | Group A | Rank | 9th–16th | 9th–12th | 11th–12th | Rank |
|---|---|---|---|---|---|---|---|
| Kseniya Kozochkina; Elena Antonenko; Anastasiya Mamedova; Evgeniya Buykina (C) | Girls' basketball | Ivory Coast; W 16–6 | 3 | Angola; W 28–14 | France; L 12–22 | Belarus; W 21–18 | 11 |
| Kseniya Kozochkina; Elena Antonenko; Anastasiya Mamedova; Evgeniya Buykina (C) | Girls' basketball | South Korea; L 18–27 | 3 | Angola; W 28–14 | France; L 12–22 | Belarus; W 21–18 | 11 |
| Kseniya Kozochkina; Elena Antonenko; Anastasiya Mamedova; Evgeniya Buykina (C) | Girls' basketball | Vanuatu; W 33–5 | 3 | Angola; W 28–14 | France; L 12–22 | Belarus; W 21–18 | 11 |
| Kseniya Kozochkina; Elena Antonenko; Anastasiya Mamedova; Evgeniya Buykina (C) | Girls' basketball | Canada; L 15–18 | 3 | Angola; W 28–14 | France; L 12–22 | Belarus; W 21–18 | 11 |

== Boxing ==
Boys

| Athlete | Event | Preliminaries | Semifinals | Final | Rank |
|---|---|---|---|---|---|
| Vasiliy Vetkin | Flyweight (51kg) | Emmanuel Rodríguez (PUR); L 4–11 | Did not advance | 5th place bout Shaban Shahpalangov (AZE); W RSC R2 2:48 | 5 |
| Anzor Elpiev | Light heavyweight (81kg) | Irosvani Duverger (CUB); L 1–7 | Did not advance | 5th place bout Bijan Aksin (IRI); W RSC R1 2:40 | 5 |
| Alexander Ivanov | Heavyweight (91kg) | Umit Can Patrir (TUR); L 1–4 | Did not advance | 5th place bout Joshua Temple (USA); W RSC R1 2:48 | 5 |

== Canoeing ==
Boys

| Athlete | Event | Time Trial | | Round 1 | Round 2 (Rep) | Round 3 | Round 4 | Round 5 | Final |
| Athlete | Event | Time | Rank | Round 1 | Round 2 (Rep) | Round 3 | Round 4 | Round 5 | Final |
|---|---|---|---|---|---|---|---|---|---|
| Alexey Volgin | Boys' C1 slalom | 2:48.65 | 14 | Wang (CHN); L DNF-1:33.91 | Did not advance | | | | |
| Alexey Volgin | Boys' C1 sprint | DSQ | | Did not advance | | | | | |
| Igor Kalashnikov | Boys' K1 slalom | 1:47.43 | 15 | Zelnychenko (UKR); L 1:47.38-1:38.25 | Dipoko (CMR); L DSQ-1:51.10 | Did not advance | | | |
| Igor Kalashnikov | Boys' K1 sprint | 1:33.74 | 10 | Bernis (FRA); W 1:33.15-1:35.31 | | Ooi (SIN); W 1:32.06-1:33.54 | Garcia (ESP); L 1:32.87-1:32.42 | Did not advance | |

Girls

| Athlete | Event | Time Trial | | Round 1 | Round 2 (Rep) | Round 3 | Round 4 | Round 5 | Final |
| Athlete | Event | Time | Rank | Round 1 | Round 2 (Rep) | Round 3 | Round 4 | Round 5 | Final |
|---|---|---|---|---|---|---|---|---|---|
| Natalia Podolskaya | Girls' K1 slalom | 1:57.33 | 13 | Villumsen (DEN); W 1:52.23-2:00.81 | | Hostens (FRA); L 1:56.18-1:45.35 | Did not advance | | |
| Natalia Podolskaya | Girls' K1 sprint | 1:41.65 | 2 | Ceita (STP); W 1:41.22-2:19.89 | | Novak (SLO); W 1:41.85-1:54.22 | Monleon (ESP); L DNF-1:46.35 | Did not advance | |

== Fencing ==
Group Stage

| Athlete | Event | Match 1 | Match 2 | Match 3 | Match 4 | Match 5 | Match 6 | Seed |
|---|---|---|---|---|---|---|---|---|
| Kirill Lichagin | Boys' foil | Gyorgi (HUN); W 5–4 | Tofalides (GBR); W 5–4 | Lee (KOR); L 1–5 | Mahmoud (EGY); W 5–3 | Luperi (ITA); L 2–5 | | 5 |
| Artur Okunev | Boys' sabre | Szatmári (HUN); W 5–4 | Spear (USA); L 2–5 | Mallette (CAN); W 5–3 | Affede (ITA); L 3–5 | Song (KOR); W 5–3 | | 7 |
| Yulia Bakhareva | Girls' épée | Matshaya (RSA); W 5–1 | Tataran (ROU); W 5–3 | Lee (KOR); W 5–4 | Radford (GBR); W 5–4 | Tella (ARG); W 5–3 | | 2 |
| Victoria Alekseeva | Girls' foil | Jaoude (LIB); W 5–0 | Goldie (CAN); L 3–5 | Shaito (USA); L 3–5 | Daw (EGY); W 5–0 | Ndao (SEN); W 5–2 | Mancini (ITA); W 5–0 | 3 |
| Yana Egoryan | Girls' sabre | Seo (KOR); L 3–5 | Ciardullo (ITA); L 3–5 | Boudad (FRA); W 5–3 | Ahmed (EGY); W 5–0 | Carreno (VEN); W 5–3 | | 6 |

Knock-Out Stage

| Athlete | Event | Round of 16 | Quarterfinals | Semifinals | Final | Rank |
|---|---|---|---|---|---|---|
| Kirill Lichagin | Boys' foil | Ong (SIN); W 15–10 | Lee (KOR); L 10–15 | Did not advance | | 5 |
| Artur Okunev | Boys' sabre | Wang (HKG); W 15–14 | Akula (BLR); L 12–15 | Did not advance | | 7 |
| Yulia Bakhareva | Girls' épée | | Santuccio (ITA); L 7–13 | Did not advance | | 5 |
| Victoria Alekseeva | Girls' foil | | Wong (SIN); W 15–5 | Lupkovics (HUN); W 15–11 | Mancini (ITA); L 9–15 | Silver medal |
| Yana Egoryan | Girls' sabre | Carreno (VEN); W 15–7 | Seo (KOR); W 15–11 | Komaschuk (UKR); W 15–14 | Merza (USA); W 15–8 | Gold medal |
| Europe 1 Yana Egoryan (RUS); Marco Fichera (ITA); Camilla Mancini (ITA); Leonardo Affede (ITA); Alberta Santuccio (ITA); Edoardo Luperi (ITA) | Mixed team | | Americas 2 W 30–17 | Americas 1 W 30–25 | Europe 2 W 30–24 | Gold medal |
| Europe 2 Anja Musch (GER); Nikolaus Bodoczi (GER); Victoria Alekseeva (RUS); Richard Hübers (GER); Martyna Swatowska (POL); Tevfik Burak Babaoğlu (TUR) | Mixed team | | Asia-Oceania 2 W 30–21 | Asia-Oceania 1 W 30–27 | Europe 1 L 24–30 | Silver medal |
| Europe 3 Alina Komaschuk (UKR); Tomasz Kruk (POL); Dora Lupkovics (HUN); Mikhail Akula (BLR); Yulia Bakhareva (RUS); Kirill Lichagin (RUS) | Mixed team | | Americas 1 L 28–30 | 5th–8th Americas 2 W 30–23 | 5th–6th Europe 4 L 29–30 | 6 |

== Gymnastics ==
=== Artistic Gymnastics ===
Boys

| Athlete | Event | Floor | | pommel horse | | Rings | | vault | | parallel Bars | | Horizontal Bar | | Total | |
| Athlete | Event | Score | Rank | Score | Rank | Score | Rank | Score | Rank | Score | Rank | Score | Rank | Score | Rank |
|---|---|---|---|---|---|---|---|---|---|---|---|---|---|---|---|
| Daniil Kazachkov | Boys' Qualification | 13.800 | 13 | 13.950 | 3 Q | 14.100 | 4 Q | 15.800 | 3 Q | 13.900 | 7 Q | 13.850 | 7 Q | 85.400 | 5 Q |
| Daniil Kazachkov | Boys' individual all-around | 14.050 | 5 | 13.700 | 2 | 13.550 | 9 | 15.550 | 7 | 13.150 | 14 | 14.000 | 3 | 84.000 | 6 |

| Athlete | Event | Score | Rank |
|---|---|---|---|
| Daniil Kazachkov | Boys' pommel horse | 13.550 | Bronze medal |
| Daniil Kazachkov | Boys' Rings | 13.825 | 6 |
| Daniil Kazachkov | Boys' vault | 14.962 | 6 |
| Daniil Kazachkov | Boys' parallel Bars | 12.900 | 8 |
| Daniil Kazachkov | Boys' Horizontal Bar | 14.025 | 5 |

Girls

| Athlete | Event | vault | | uneven bars | | Beam | | Floor | | Total | |
| Athlete | Event | Score | Rank | Score | Rank | Score | Rank | Score | Rank | Score | Rank |
|---|---|---|---|---|---|---|---|---|---|---|---|
| Viktoria Komova | Girls' Qualification | 15.700 | 1 Q | 15.600 | 1 Q | 15.150 | 2 Q | 14.550 | 1 Q | 61.000 | 1 Q |
| Viktoria Komova | Girls' individual all-around | 15.650 | 1 | 15.450 | 1 | 15.250 | 2 | 14.900 | 1 | 61.250 | Gold medal |

| Athlete | Event | Score | Rank |
|---|---|---|---|
| Viktoria Komova | Girls' vault | 15.312 | Gold medal |
| Viktoria Komova | Girls' uneven bars | 14.525 | Gold medal |
| Viktoria Komova | Girls' Beam | 12.000 | 7 |
| Viktoria Komova | Girls' Floor | 14.175 | Bronze medal |

=== Rhythmic Gymnastics ===
Individual

| Athlete | Event | Qualification | | | | | | Final | | | | | |
| Athlete | Event | Rope | Hoop | Ball | Clubs | Total | Rank | Rope | Hoop | Ball | Clubs | Total | Rank |
|---|---|---|---|---|---|---|---|---|---|---|---|---|---|
| Alexandra Merkulova | Girls' individual all-around | 25.550 | 26.300 | 26.200 | 25.375 | 103.425 | 1 Q | 25.950 | 26.250 | 25.800 | 25.550 | 103.500 | Gold medal |

Team

| Athlete | Event | Qualification | | | | Final | | | |
| Athlete | Event | Hoops | Ribbons | Total | Rank | Hoops | Ribbons | Total | Rank |
|---|---|---|---|---|---|---|---|---|---|
| Ksenia Dudkina; Olga Ilina; Alina Makarenko; Karolina Sevastyanova | Girls' Group all-around | 26.450 | 25.800 | 52.250 | 1 Q | 26.275 | 26.075 | 52.350 | Gold medal |

== Handball ==
| Squad list | Event | Group Stage | | Semifinal | Final | Rank |
| Squad list | Event | Group A | Rank | Semifinal | Final | Rank |
|---|---|---|---|---|---|---|
| Daria Vakhterova; Irina Zagaynova; Tamara Chopikyan; Nadezda Koroleva; Oxana Korobkova; Nadezda Pastukh; Anna Shukalova; Ksenia Milova; Veronika Garanina; Natalia Anisimova; Oxana Kondrashina; Nataliya Danshina; Victoria Divak; Ekaterina Chernobrovina | Girls' Handball | Brazil; W 35–20 | 1 Q | Kazakhstan; W 41–19 | Denmark; L 26–28 | Silver medal |
| Daria Vakhterova; Irina Zagaynova; Tamara Chopikyan; Nadezda Koroleva; Oxana Korobkova; Nadezda Pastukh; Anna Shukalova; Ksenia Milova; Veronika Garanina; Natalia Anisimova; Oxana Kondrashina; Nataliya Danshina; Victoria Divak; Ekaterina Chernobrovina | Girls' Handball | Angola; W 41–22 | 1 Q | Kazakhstan; W 41–19 | Denmark; L 26–28 | Silver medal |

== Judo ==
Individual

| Athlete | Event | Round 1 | Round 2 | Round 3 | Semifinals | Final | Rank |
| Athlete | Event | Opposition Result | Opposition Result | Opposition Result | Opposition Result | Opposition Result | Rank |
|---|---|---|---|---|---|---|---|
| Khasan Khalmurzaev | Boys' −81 kg | BYE | Szakacz (SVK); W 100–001 | | Toth (HUN); W 001–000 | Lee (KOR); L 001–002 | Silver medal |
| Anna Dmitrieva | Girls' −52 kg | Tang (SIN); W 110–000 | Wu (TPE); W 011–001 | | Ri (PRK); W 100–001 | Bouyssou (USA); L 000–021 | Silver medal |

Team

| Team | Event | Round 1 | Round 2 | Semifinals | Final | Rank |
| Team | Event | Opposition Result | Opposition Result | Opposition Result | Opposition Result | Rank |
|---|---|---|---|---|---|---|
| Paris; Barbara Batizi (HUN); Patrick Marxer (LIE); Maja Rasinska (POL); Farshid Ghasemi Asl (IRI); Sophina Arrey (CMR); Khasan Khalmurzaev (RUS); Sana Khelifi (ALG); Fernando Vanoye (MEX) | Mixed team | Tokyo; L 3–5 | Did not advance | | | 9 |
| Belgrade; Anna Dmitrieva (RUS); Jeremy Saywell (MLT); Jennet Geldybayeva (TKM); Babacar Cisse (SEN); Haley Baxter (NZL); Otgonbayaryn Dölgöön (MGL); Lola Mansour (BEL); Marius Piepke (GER) | Mixed team | BYE | Osaka; W 4–4 (3–1) | Tokyo; W 5–3 | Essen; L 1–6 | Silver medal |

== Modern pentathlon ==
| Athlete | Event | Fencing (épée One Touch) | | | Swimming (200m freestyle) | | | Running & Shooting (3000m, Laser Pistol) | | | Total Points | Final Rank |
| Athlete | Event | Results | Rank | Points | Time | Rank | Points | Time | Rank | Points | Total Points | Final Rank |
|---|---|---|---|---|---|---|---|---|---|---|---|---|
| Ilya Shugarov | Boys' individual | 17–6 | 1 | 1040 | 2:06.40 | 4 | 1284 | 11:29.42 | 10 | 2244 | 4568 | Silver medal |
| Gulnaz Gubaydullina | Girls' individual | 8–15 | 19 | 680 | 2:12.87 | 2 | 1208 | 12:53.28 | 9 | 1908 | 3796 | 9 |
| Anastasiya Spas (UKR); Ilya Shugarov (RUS) | Mixed relay | 63–29 | 1 | 990 | 2:02.25 | 4 | 1336 | 15:42.32 | 9 | 2312 | 4638 | Gold medal |
| Gulnaz Gubaydullina (RUS); Lukas Kontrimavicius (LTU) | Mixed relay | 35–57 | 22 | 710 | 1:59.05 | 2 | 1372 | 14:59.91 | 1 | 2484 | 4566 | Bronze medal |

== Rowing ==
| Athlete | Event | Heats | | Repechage | | Semifinals | | Final | | Overall Rank |
| Athlete | Event | Time | Rank | Time | Rank | Time | Rank | Time | Rank | Overall Rank |
|---|---|---|---|---|---|---|---|---|---|---|
| Elizaveta Tikhanova; Anastasia Tikhanova | Girls' Pair | 3:43.98 | 3 QA/B | | | 3:51.46 | 5 QB | 3:42.13 | 2 | 8 |

== Sailing ==
Windsurfing

| Athlete | Event | Race | | | | | | | | | | | Points | Rank |
| Athlete | Event | 1 | 2 | 3 | 4 | 5 | 6 | 7 | 8 | 9 | 10 | M* | Points | Rank |
|---|---|---|---|---|---|---|---|---|---|---|---|---|---|---|
| Artem Murashev | Boys' Techno 293 | 6 | 6 | 5 | 2 | 12 | 5 | 6 | 5 | ~~DSQ~~ | 1 | 2 | 50 | 5 |

== Shooting ==
Pistol

| Athlete | Event | Qualification | | Final | | |
| Athlete | Event | Score | Rank | Score | Total | Rank |
|---|---|---|---|---|---|---|
| Nikolai Kilin | Boys' 10m Air Pistol | 572 | 4 Q | 96.8 | 668.8 | 8 |
| Ekaterina Barsukova | Girls' 10m Air Pistol | 376 | 3 Q | 92.5 | 468.5 | 5 |

Rifle

| Athlete | Event | Qualification | | Final | | |
| Athlete | Event | Score | Rank | Score | Total | Rank |
|---|---|---|---|---|---|---|
| Egor Maksimov | Boys' 10m Air Rifle | 574 | 19 | Did not advance | | |

== Swimming ==
Boys

| Athletes | Event | Heat | | Semifinal | | Final | |
| Athletes | Event | Time | Position | Time | Position | Time | Position |
|---|---|---|---|---|---|---|---|
| Andrey Ushakov | Boys' 100m freestyle | 51.92 | 16 Q | 51.49 | 10 | Did not advance | |
| Andrey Ushakov | Boys' 200m freestyle | 1:50.34 | 1 Q | | | 1:49.81 | Gold medal |
| Anton Labanov | Boys' 50m breaststroke | 28.93 | 3 Q | 28.87 | 2 Q | 28.76 | 4 |
| Anton Labanov | Boys' 100m breaststroke | 1:03.29 | 4 Q | 1:02.60 | 3 Q | 1:01.44 | Silver medal |
| Anton Labanov | Boys' 200m breaststroke | 2:17.60 | 3 Q | | | 2:13.65 | Silver medal |
| Alexey Atsapkin | Boys' 200m breaststroke | 2:18.06 | 5 Q | | | Withdrew | |
| Alexey Atsapkin | Boys' 200m individual medley | 2:03.69 | 4 Q | | | 2:03.66 | 5 |
| Ilya Lemaev | Boys' 100m Butterfly | 55.77 | 18 | Did not advance | | | |
| Ilya Lemaev | Boys' 200m Butterfly | 2:04.16 | 11 | | | Did not advance | |
| Andrey Ushakov; Alexey Atsapkin; Ilya Lemaev; Anton Lobanov | Boys' 4 × 100 m freestyle relay | 3:27.21 | 6 Q | | | 3:23.91 | Gold medal |
| Andrey Ushakov; Alexey Atsapkin; Ilya Lemaev; Anton Lobanov | Boys' 4 × 100 m medley relay | 3.46:48 | 3 Q | | | 3:44.65 | 5 |

Girls

| Athletes | Event | Heat | | Semifinal | | Final | |
| Athletes | Event | Time | Position | Time | Position | Time | Position |
|---|---|---|---|---|---|---|---|
| Ekaterina Andreeva | Girls' 200m freestyle | 2:06.37 | 20 | | | Did not advance | |
| Ekaterina Andreeva | Girls' 200m individual medley | 2:17.10 | 4 Q | | | 2:17.37 | 4 |
| Alexandra Papusha | Girls' 50m backstroke | 29.64 | 1 Q | 29.55 | 3 Q | 29.51 | Bronze medal |
| Alexandra Papusha | Girls' 100m backstroke | 1:02.33 | 3 Q | 1:02.62 | 3 Q | 1:02.15 | Bronze medal |
| Alexandra Papusha | Girls' 200m backstroke | 2:17.36 | 10 | | | Did not advance | |
| Olga Detenyuk | Girls' 100m breaststroke | 1:12.68 | 9 Q | 1:12.68 | 13 | Did not advance | |
| Olga Detenyuk | Girls' 200m breaststroke | 2:33.30 | 6 Q | | | 2:34.15 | 6 |
| Kristina Kochetkova | Girls' 100m Butterfly | 1:01.08 | 4 Q | 1:00.99 | 5 Q | 1:01.04 | 6 |
| Kristina Kochetkova | Girls' 200m individual medley | 2:15.73 | 1 Q | | | 2:15.13 | Silver medal |
| Alexandra Papusha; Kristina Kochetkova; Ekaterina Andreeva; Olga Detenyuk | Girls' 4 × 100 m freestyle relay | DSQ | | | | Did not advance | |
| Alexandra Papusha; Kristina Kochetkova; Ekaterina Andreeva; Olga Detenyuk | Girls' 4 × 100 m medley relay | 4:13.43 | 3 Q | | | 4:11.07 | Silver medal |

Mixed

| Athletes | Event | Heat | | Semifinal | | Final | |
| Athletes | Event | Time | Position | Time | Position | Time | Position |
|---|---|---|---|---|---|---|---|
| Andrey Ushakov; Kristina Kochetkova; Alexey Atsapkin; Ekaterina Andreeva | Mixed 4 × 100 m freestyle relay | 3:39.69 | 7 Q | | | 3:42.63 | 8 |
| Ilya Lemaev*; Alexey Atsapkin*; Ekaterina Andreeva*; Alexandra Papusha; Anton Lobanov; Kristina Kochetkova; Andrey Ushakov | Mixed 4 × 100 m medley relay | 4:00.67 | 3 Q | | | 3:55.29 | Silver medal |

- * raced in heats only

== Table tennis ==
Individual

| Athlete | Event | Round 1 | | Round 2 | | Quarterfinals | Semifinals | Final | Rank |
| Athlete | Event | Group Matches | Rank | Group Matches | Rank | Quarterfinals | Semifinals | Final | Rank |
|---|---|---|---|---|---|---|---|---|---|
| Yana Noskova | Girls' singles | Huang (TPE); W 3–0 (17–15, 11–5, 11–7) | 1 Q | Gu (CHN); L 0–3 (12–14, 9–11, 6–11) | 3 | Did not advance | | | 9 |
| Yana Noskova | Girls' singles | Kumahara (BRA); W 3–0 (12–10, 11–7, 11–9) | 1 Q | Tanioka (JPN); L 1–3 (7–11, 11–7, 10–12, 7–11) | 3 | Did not advance | | | 9 |
| Yana Noskova | Girls' singles | Rosheuvel (GUY); W 3–0 (11–4, 11–4, 11–2) | 1 Q | Meshref (EGY); W 3–1 (11–8, 11–13, 11–7, 12–10) | 3 | Did not advance | | | 9 |

Team

| Athlete | Event | Round 1 | | Round 2 | Quarterfinals | Semifinals | Final | Rank |
| Athlete | Event | Group Matches | Rank | Round 2 | Quarterfinals | Semifinals | Final | Rank |
|---|---|---|---|---|---|---|---|---|
| Intercontinental 2 Yana Noskova (RUS); Elmurod Holikov (UZB) | Mixed team | Singapore; Li (SIN); Chew (SIN); L 1–2 (3–2, 0–3, 1–3) | 3 qB | Africa 2 Ivoso (CGO); Kam (MRI); W 2–0 (3–0, 3–0) | Europe 5 Baravok (BLR); Bajger (CZE); L 0–2 (wd) | Did not advance | | 21 |
| Intercontinental 2 Yana Noskova (RUS); Elmurod Holikov (UZB) | Mixed team | Africa 1 Laid (ALG); Onaolapo (NGR); W 2–1 (3–0, 0–3, 3–0) | 3 qB | Africa 2 Ivoso (CGO); Kam (MRI); W 2–0 (3–0, 3–0) | Europe 5 Baravok (BLR); Bajger (CZE); L 0–2 (wd) | Did not advance | | 21 |
| Intercontinental 2 Yana Noskova (RUS); Elmurod Holikov (UZB) | Mixed team | Egypt; Meshref (EGY); Bedair (EGY); L 0–3 (2–3, 0–3, 1–3) | 3 qB | Africa 2 Ivoso (CGO); Kam (MRI); W 2–0 (3–0, 3–0) | Europe 5 Baravok (BLR); Bajger (CZE); L 0–2 (wd) | Did not advance | | 21 |

== Taekwondo ==
| Athlete | Event | Preliminary | Quarterfinal | Semifinal | Final | Rank |
|---|---|---|---|---|---|---|
| Konstantin Minin | Boys' −63kg | BYE | Alejandro Valdés (MEX); L 6–8 | Did not advance | | 5 |
| Aliaskhab Sirazhov | Boys' −73kg | BYE | Vilson Lajcaj (MNE); W 10–1 | Michel Samaha (LIB); W 10–4 | Jin Hak Kim (KOR); L 4–6 | Silver medal |
| Anastasia Valueva | Girls' −44kg | BYE | Lineo Machobane (LES); W DSQ | Seyma Tuncer (TUR); W 8–4 | Iryna Romoldanova (UKR); W 7–1 | Gold medal |
| Olga Ivanova | Girls' +63kg | Hulita Matekuolava (TGA); W RSC R1 0:07 | Briseida Acosta (MEX); L 7–12 | Did not advance | | 5 |

== Tennis ==
singles

| Athlete | Event | Round 1 | Round 2 | Quarterfinals | Semifinals | Final | Rank |
|---|---|---|---|---|---|---|---|
| Victor Baluda | Boys' singles | Wang Chuhan (CHN); W 2–0 (7–5, 6–2) | Ricardo Rodriguez (VEN); W 2–1 (6–2, 4–6, 6–3) | Fernandes (BRA); W 2–0 (6–2, 7–6) | Gómez (COL); L 1–2 (1–6, 6–3, 5–7) | Bronze Medal Match; Džumhur (BIH); L 0–2 (5–7, 1–6) | 4 |
| Mikhail Biryukov | Boys' singles | Pavić (CRO); W 2–0 (6–3, 6–3) | Džumhur (BIH); L 0–2 (4–6, 1–6) | Did not advance | | | |
| Daria Gavrilova | Girls' singles | Tan (SIN); W 2–0 (6–2, 6–3) | Svitolina (UKR); W 2–0 (6–2, 6–3) | Tang (CHN); W 2–0 (6–0, 6–2) | Čepelová (SVK); W 2–1 (5–7, 7–5, 6–3) | Zheng (CHN); W 2–1 (2–6, 6–2, 6–0) | Gold medal |
| Yulia Putintseva | Girls' singles | Mutaguchi (JPN); W 2–0 (6–3, 6–4) | Mestach (BEL); W 2–0 (6–4, 6–0) | Babos (HUN); L 0–2 (1–6, 3–6) | Did not advance | | |

doubles

| Athlete | Event | Round 1 | Quarterfinals | Semifinals | Final | Rank |
|---|---|---|---|---|---|---|
| Victor Baluda (RUS); Mikhail Biryukov (RUS) | Boys' doubles | King (BAR); Krainik (CAN); W 2–0 (6–4, 6–3) | Fucsovics (HUN); Zsiga (HUN); W 2–0 (6–2, 6–4) | Horanský (SVK); Kovalík (SVK); W 2–0 (6–4, 7–5) | Golding (GBR); Vesely (CZE); L 0–2 (3-6, 1–6) | Silver medal |
| Daria Gavrilova (RUS); Yulia Putintseva (RUS) | Girls' doubles | Puig (PUR); Tan (SIN); W 2–0 (6–4, 7–5) | Kovalets (UKR); Svitolina (UKR); W 2–0 (6–4, 6–4) | Čepelová (SVK); Škamlová (SVK); L 0–2 (4–6, 6–7) | Bronze Medal Match; Babos (HUN); Mestach (BEL); L 0–2 (2–6, 2–6) | 4 |

== Volleyball ==
| Squad list | Event | Group Stage | | Semifinal | Bronze Medal Match | Rank |
| Squad list | Event | Group A | Rank | Semifinal | Bronze Medal Match | Rank |
|---|---|---|---|---|---|---|
| Vladmir Manerov; Bogdan Glivenko; Ivan Komarov; Dmitriy Solodilin; Valentin Galubev; Aleksander Shchurin; Filipp Mokievskiy; Alexy Tertyshnikov; Konstantin Osipov (C); Ilya Nikitin; Vadim Zolotukhin; Maxim Kulikov | Boys' volleyball | Serbia; W 3–0 (25–17, 25–20, 25–12) | 1 Q | Argentina; L 0–3 (10–25, 16–25, 19–25) | Serbia; W 3–0 (25–17, 25–17, 25–15) | Bronze medal |
| Vladmir Manerov; Bogdan Glivenko; Ivan Komarov; Dmitriy Solodilin; Valentin Galubev; Aleksander Shchurin; Filipp Mokievskiy; Alexy Tertyshnikov; Konstantin Osipov (C); Ilya Nikitin; Vadim Zolotukhin; Maxim Kulikov | Boys' volleyball | DR Congo; W 3–0 (25–22, 25–15, 25–13) | 1 Q | Argentina; L 0–3 (10–25, 16–25, 19–25) | Serbia; W 3–0 (25–17, 25–17, 25–15) | Bronze medal |

== Weightlifting ==
| Athlete | Event | Snatch | Clean & Jerk | Total | Rank |
|---|---|---|---|---|---|
| Artem Okulov | Boys' 77kg | 145 | 182 | 327 | Gold medal |
| Alexey Kosov | Boys' 85kg | 154 | 180 | 334 | Silver medal |
| Diana Akhmetova | Girls' 63kg | 94 | 110 | 204 | Silver medal |
| Olga Zubova | Girls' +63kg | 112 | 139 | 251 | Gold medal |

== Wrestling ==
freestyle

| Athlete | Event | Pools | | Final | Rank |
| Athlete | Event | Groups | Rank | Final | Rank |
|---|---|---|---|---|---|
| Aldar Balzhinimaev | Boys' 46kg | Abdelnaeem (EGY); W 2–0 (3–0, 2–1) | 1 | Sheihki (IRI); W Fall (4–2, 7–0) | Gold medal |
| Aldar Balzhinimaev | Boys' 46kg | Hovhannisyan (ARM); W 2–0 (4–1, 4–1) | 1 | Sheihki (IRI); W Fall (4–2, 7–0) | Gold medal |
| Azamatbi Pshnatlov | Boys' 63kg | Pilay (ECU); W 2–0 (3–0, 8–0) | 1 | Kadirov (TJK); W Fall (4–0) | Gold medal |
| Azamatbi Pshnatlov | Boys' 63kg | Mosidze (GEO); W T. Fall (7–0, 6–0) | 1 | Kadirov (TJK); W Fall (4–0) | Gold medal |
| Azamatbi Pshnatlov | Boys' 63kg | Fazlic (AUS); W Fall (3–0) | 1 | Kadirov (TJK); W Fall (4–0) | Gold medal |
| Svetlana Lipatova | Girls' 60kg | Ford (NZL); W 2–0 (4–0, 4–0) | 2 | 3rd place match Ahmed (BUL); W 2–0 (1–0, 4–0) | Bronze medal |
| Svetlana Lipatova | Girls' 60kg | Baatarzorigyn Battsetseg (MGL); L 1–2 (1–0, 0–1, 1–1+) | 2 | 3rd place match Ahmed (BUL); W 2–0 (1–0, 4–0) | Bronze medal |
| Svetlana Lipatova | Girls' 60kg | Victor (NGR); W 2–0 (4–1, 4–0) | 2 | 3rd place match Ahmed (BUL); W 2–0 (1–0, 4–0) | Bronze medal |
| Svetlana Lipatova | Girls' 60kg | Souare (GUI); W 2–0 (6–0, 3–0) | 2 | 3rd place match Ahmed (BUL); W 2–0 (1–0, 4–0) | Bronze medal |

Greco-Roman

| Athlete | Event | Pools | | Final | Rank |
| Athlete | Event | Groups | Rank | Final | Rank |
|---|---|---|---|---|---|
| Artur Suleymanov | Boys' 58kg | Lytvynov (UKR); L 1–2 (7–0, 0–1, 0–1) | 2 | 3rd place match Afrikaner (NAM); W 2–0 (1–0, 3–0) | Bronze medal |
| Artur Suleymanov | Boys' 58kg | Camarillo (MEX); W 2–0 (4–1, 1–0) | 2 | 3rd place match Afrikaner (NAM); W 2–0 (1–0, 3–0) | Bronze medal |
| Artur Suleymanov | Boys' 58kg | Gregory (RSA); W Fall (6–0, 5–0) | 2 | 3rd place match Afrikaner (NAM); W 2–0 (1–0, 3–0) | Bronze medal |
| Ruslan Adzhigov | Boys' 85kg | Petrosyan (ARM); W 2–1 (6–0, 0–1, 1–0) | 1 | Abdelwahab (EGY); W Fall (1–0, 2–0) | Gold medal |
| Ruslan Adzhigov | Boys' 85kg | Kamilov (UZB); W 2–0 (2–0, 3–1) | 1 | Abdelwahab (EGY); W Fall (1–0, 2–0) | Gold medal |
| Ruslan Adzhigov | Boys' 85kg | Choi (KOR); W 2–0 (6–0, 6–2) | 1 | Abdelwahab (EGY); W Fall (1–0, 2–0) | Gold medal |
