= Canada at the 2010 Summer Youth Olympics =

- IOC code: CAN
- NOC: Canadian Olympic Committee
- Website: www.olympic.ca (in English and French)

in Singapore
- Competitors: 60 in 18 sports
- Flag bearer: Jeremy Bagshaw
- Medals Ranked 16th: Gold 3 Silver 1 Bronze 8 Total 12

Summer Youth Olympics appearances
- 2010; 2014; 2018

60 athletes in 18 sports were set to compete for Canada at the 2010 Summer Youth Olympics in Singapore nominated by the Canadian Olympic Committee and making it one of its largest delegations. Canada did not participate in the following sports: boxing, football, handball, field hockey, modern pentathlon, rowing, table tennis and volleyball.

== Medalists ==
Medal	Name	Sport	Event	Date
Gold	Rachel Nicol	Swimming	Youth women's 50m breaststroke	16 Aug
Gold	Dorothy Yeats	Wrestling	Women's Freestyle 70kg	17 Aug
Gold	Tera van Beilen	Swimming	Women's 100m breaststroke	18 Aug
Silver	Tera van Beilen	Swimming	Women's 200m breaststroke	20 Aug
Bronze	Melanie Phan	Taekwondo	Women's 49kg	15 Aug
Bronze	Alexandre Lyssov	Fencing	Cadet male épée	16 Aug
Bronze	Jeremy Bagshaw	Swimming	Youth men's 200m freestyle	16 Aug
Bronze	Lauren Earp	Swimming	Youth women's 100m freestyle	17 Aug
Bronze	Rachel Nicol	Swimming	Youth women's 100m breaststroke	18 Aug
Bronze	Alanna Goldie; Alexandre Lyssov	Fencing	Mixed team	18 Aug
Bronze	Lindsay Delmar; Tera van Beilen; Rachel Nicol; Lauren Earp	Swimming	Youth women's 4 × 100 m freestyle	19 Aug
Bronze	Stefan Bozalo	Taekwondo	Men's +73 kg division	19 Aug
Bronze	Katrina Cameron; Melodie Omidi; Angelika Reznik; Victoria Reznik	Gymnastics	Youth rhythmic group all-around	25 Aug

== Archery ==
Canada qualified 1 archer.

Boys

Athlete	Event	Ranking round		Round of 32	Round of 16	Quarterfinals	Semifinals	Final	
Athlete	Event	Score	Seed	Opposition Score	Opposition Score	Opposition Score	Opposition Score	Opposition Score	Rank
Timon Park	Boys' individual	601	21	Milon (BAN); L 2-6	Did not advance				17

Mixed team

Athlete	Event	Partner	Round of 32	Round of 16	Quarterfinals	Semifinals	Final	
Athlete	Event	Partner	Opposition Score	Opposition Score	Opposition Score	Opposition Score	Opposition Score	Rank
Timon Park	Mixed team	Isabel Viehmeier (GER)	Ingley (AUS)/ Koiwa (JPN); L 3-7	Did not advance				17

== Athletics ==
Canada qualified 9 athletes.

=== Boys ===
Track and road events

Athletes	Event	Qualification		Final	
Athletes	Event	Result	Rank	Result	Rank
Eamonn Kichuk	Boys' 3000m	9:17.37	19 qB	9:25.90	18

=== Girls ===
Track and road events

Athletes	Event	Qualification		Final	
Athletes	Event	Result	Rank	Result	Rank
Shai-Anne Davis	Girls' 100m	12.46	13 qB	12.35	12
Isatu Fofanah	Girls' 200m	24.54	6 Q	24.42	6
Katherine Reid	Girls' 400m	54.54	5 Q	53.69	5
Gabrielle Edwards	Girls' 3000m	10:18.59	12 qB	10:32.66	15
Brittany Lewis	Girls' 400m hurdles	1:00.16	6 Q	59.86	4
Katelyn Hayward	Girls' 2000m steeplechase	7:05.71	10 qB	7:05.75	11

Field events

Athletes	Event	Qualification		Final	
Athletes	Event	Result	Rank	Result	Rank
Rayann Chin	Girls' shot put	12.06	13 qB	12.64	13
Rachel Romu	Girls' long jump	5.50	14 qB	5.79	10

== Badminton ==
Canada qualified 2 badminton athletes.

Boys

Athlete	Event	Group stage				Knock-out stage			
Athlete	Event	Match 1	Match 2	Match 3	Rank	Quarterfinal	Semifinal	Final	Rank
Henry Pan	Boys' singles	Djabar (SUR) W 2-1 (12-21, 23-21, 21-16)	Horiuchi (JPN) L 0-2 (18-21, 10-21)	Sukamta (INA) L 0-2 (17-21, 13-21)	3	Did not advance			

Girls

Athlete	Event	Group stage				Knock-out stage			
Athlete	Event	Match 1	Match 2	Match 3	Rank	Quarterfinal	Semifinal	Final	Rank
Tracy Wong	Girls' singles	Kune (MRI) W 2-0 (21-17, 21-19)	Wentholt (NED) L 0-2 (15-21, 8-21)	Matsutomo (JPN) L 0-2 (11-21, 9-21)	3	Did not advance			

== Basketball ==
Canada qualified a girls team.

Girls

Squad list	Event	Group stage		Placement stage			Rank
Squad list	Event	Group A	Rank	1st-8th	1st-4th	3rd-4th	Rank
Dakota Whyte; Kaylee Halvorson; Tiye Traore (C); Kaylee Kilpatrick	Girls' basketball	Vanuatu; W 27-12	1	Germany; W 33-15	China; L 21-28	United States; L 16-34	4
Dakota Whyte; Kaylee Halvorson; Tiye Traore (C); Kaylee Kilpatrick	Girls' basketball	Ivory Coast; W 25-12	1	Germany; W 33-15	China; L 21-28	United States; L 16-34	4
Dakota Whyte; Kaylee Halvorson; Tiye Traore (C); Kaylee Kilpatrick	Girls' basketball	South Korea; W 20-6	1	Germany; W 33-15	China; L 21-28	United States; L 16-34	4
Dakota Whyte; Kaylee Halvorson; Tiye Traore (C); Kaylee Kilpatrick	Girls' basketball	Russia; W 18-15	1	Germany; W 33-15	China; L 21-28	United States; L 16-34	4

== Canoeing ==
Canada qualified 2 Canoers.

Boys

Athlete	Event	Time trial		Round 1	Round 2 (Rep)	Round 3	Round 4	Round 5	Final	Rank
Athlete	Event	Time	Rank	Round 1	Round 2 (Rep)	Round 3	Round 4	Round 5	Final	Rank
Hayden Daniels	Boys' C1 slalom	1:45.96	3	Yemelyanov (KAZ); W 1:45.46-2:08.96		Cardenas (CUB); W 1:47.73-2:06.33	Queiroz (BRA); W 1:47.60-DNF	Soeter (GER); L 1:48.94-1:42.93	Melnyk (UKR); L 1:46.77-1:44.36	4
Hayden Daniels	Boys' C1 sprint	3:33.76	15	Cardenas (CUB); L 3:29.00-1:45.11	Tiganu (MDA); L DNF-1:47.83	Did not advance				

Girls

Athlete	Event	Time trial		Round 1	Round 2 (Rep)	Round 3	Round 4	Round 5	Final
Athlete	Event	Time	Rank	Round 1	Round 2 (Rep)	Round 3	Round 4	Round 5	Final
Jazmyne Denhollander	Girls' K1 slalom	1:41.03	5	Segal (RSA); W 1:43.47-2:01.86		Kichasova (UKR); W 1:42.95-1:48.55	Zasterova (CZE); L 1:43.05-1:37.31	Did not advance	
Jazmyne Denhollander	Girls' K1 sprint	2:59.49	20	Farkasdi (HUN); L 2:21.85-1:40.17	Pedroso (POR); L 2:15.57-1:46.65	Did not advance			

== Cycling ==
Canada qualified 4 cyclists.

Cross country

Athlete	Event	Time	Rank	Points
Steven Noble	Boys' cross country	1:03:34	13	64
Kristina Laforge	Girls' cross country	49:22	3	8

Time trial

Athlete	Event	Time	Rank	Points
Ryan Macdonald	Boys' time trial	4:09.61	9	20
Kristina Laforge	Girls' time trial	3:41.05	18	40

BMX

Athlete	Event	Seeding round		Quarterfinals							Semifinals							Final		
Athlete	Event	Seeding round		Run 1		Run 2		Run 3		Rank	Run 1		Run 2		Run 3		Rank	Final		
Athlete	Event	Time	Rank	Time	Rank	Time	Rank	Time	Rank	Rank	Time	Rank	Time	Rank	Time	Rank	Rank	Time	Rank	Points
Steven Creighton	Boys' BMX	33.549	16	32.532	2	33.999	5	34.342	4	4 Q	55.939	8	40.752	4	33.559	6	7	Did not advance		66
Kristina Laforge	Girls' BMX	1:00.152	29	43.349	5	42.683	3	42.683	4	4 Q	42.989	7	42.880	7	43.267	7	7	Did not advance		37

Road race

Athlete	Event	Time	Rank	Points
Steven Noble	Boys' road race	1:05:44	27	72
Steven Creighton	Boys' road race	DNF		
Ryan Macdonald	Boys' road race	DNF		

Overall

Team	Event	Cross country pts		Time trial pts		BMX pts		Road race Pts	Total	Rank
Team	Event	Boys	Girls	Boys	Girls	Boys	Girls	Road race Pts	Total	Rank
Kristina Laforge; Steven Noble; Ryan Macdonald; Steven Creighton	Mixed team	64	8	20	40	66	37	72	307	19

== Diving ==
Canada qualified 2 divers.

Boys

Athlete	Event	Preliminary		Finals	
Athlete	Event	Points	Rank	Points	Rank
Marc Sabourin-Germain	Boys' 3m springboard	474.20	10 Q	506.50	10
Marc Sabourin-Germain	Boys' 10m platform	407.75	8 Q	433.05	8

Girls

Athlete	Event	Preliminary		Finals	
Athlete	Event	Points	Rank	Points	Rank
Pamela Ware	Girls' 3m springboard	411.45	3 Q	431.55	4
Pamela Ware	Girls' 10m platform	357.90	9 Q	373.05	8

== Equestrian ==
Canada qualified 1 rider.

Athlete	Horse	Event	Round 1			Round 2			Total	Jump-Off		Rank
Athlete	Horse	Event	Penalties		Rank	Penalties		Rank	Total	Penalties	Time	Rank
Athlete	Horse	Event	Jump	Time	Rank	Jump	Time	Rank	Total	Penalties	Time	Rank
Dominique Shone	Roxy Girl	Individual jumping	0	0	1	8	0	19	8			9
Eirin Bruheim (USA); Kelsey Bayley (BAR); Alejandra Ortiz (PAN); Juan Diego Saenz Morel (GUA); Dominique Shone (CAN)	Lenny Hays; Virtuous Flare; Sobraon Park Fancy Pants; Little Plains; Roxy Girl	Team jumping	~~16~~; 8; ~~8~~; 4; 4	~~0~~; 0; ~~0~~; 0; 0	6	~~20~~; ~~12~~; 8; 8; 0	~~1~~; ~~1~~; 0; 0; 0	6	32			6

== Fencing ==
Canada qualified 3 fencers.

Pools

Athlete	Event	Match 1	Match 2	Match 3	Match 4	Match 5	Match 6	Seed
Alexandre Lyssov	Cadet male épée	Godoy (CRC); V 5-2	Lim (SIN); D 3-5	Bodoczi (GER); V 5-4	Ciovica (ROU); V 5-2	Novotny (CZE); D 4-5	Na (KOR); V 5-3	4
Miguel Breault-Mallette	Cadet male sabre	Szatmári (HUN); D 1-5	Spear (USA); V 5-3	Okunev (RUS); D 3-5	Affede (ITA); D 2-5	Song (KOR); V 5-3		9
Alanna Goldie	Cadet female foil	Jaoude (LIB); V 5-1	Alekseeva (RUS); V 5-3	Shaito (USA); V 5-2	Daw (EGY); V 5-0	Ndao (SEN); V 5-1	Mancini (ITA); V 5-2	1

Direct Elimination

Athlete	Event	Round of 16	Quarterfinals	Semifinals	Final	Rank
Alexandre Lyssov	Cadet male épée	Godoy (CRC); V 15-3	Lim (SIN); V 15-13	Fichera (ITA); D 6-15	Na (KOR); V 15-13	Bronze medal
Miguel Breault-Mallette	Cadet male sabre	Sirbu (ROU); D 8-15	Did not advance			10
Alanna Goldie	Cadet female foil		Wang (CHN); V 15-11	Mancini (ITA); D 9-15	Lupkovics (HUN); D 10-15	4
Americas 1 Celina Merza (USA); Alexandre Lyssov (CAN); Alanna Goldie (CAN); Will Spear (USA); Katharine Holmes (USA); Alexander Massialas (USA)	Mixed NOC's Team		Europe 3 V 30-28	Europe 1 D 25-30	Asia-Oceania 1 V 30-24	Bronze medal
Americas 2 Maria Carreno (VEN); Guilherme Melaragno (BRA); Mona Shaito (USA); Miguel Breault-Mallette (CAN); Clara Isabel Di Tella (ARG); Redys Prades Rosabal (CUB)	Mixed NOC's Team	Africa; V 28-25	Europe 1 D 17-30	5th-8th Europe 3 D 23-30	7th-8th Asia-Oceania 2 V 28-27	7

== Gymnastics ==
=== Artistic gymnastics ===
Boys

Athlete	Event	Floor		Pommel Horse		Rings		Vault		Parallel bars		Horizontal bar		Total	
Athlete	Event	Score	Rank	Score	Rank	Score	Rank	Score	Rank	Score	Rank	Score	Rank	Score	Rank
Robert Watson	Boys' qualification	13.850	12	12.900	24	13.500	20	14.950	24	13.850	9	13.300	18	82.350	11 Q
Robert Watson	Boys' individual all-around	14.000	7	10.700	18	13.450	12	15.050	10	13.550	12	12.900	17	79.650	17

Girls

Athlete	Event	Vault		Uneven bars		Beam		Floor		Total	
Athlete	Event	Score	Rank	Score	Rank	Score	Rank	Score	Rank	Score	Rank
Madeline Gardiner	Girls' qualification	13.750	8 Q	13.750	5 Q	13.700	7 Q	12.650	16	53.850	8 Q
Madeline Gardiner	Girls' individual all-around	13.800	7	13.150	6	12.100	16	12.050	16	51.100	13

Athlete	Event	Score	Rank
Madeline Gardiner	Girls' vault	13.587	5
Madeline Gardiner	Girls' uneven bars	9.900	8
Madeline Gardiner	Girls' Beam	Withdrew	

=== Rhythmic gymnastics ===
Individual

Athlete	Event	Qualification						Final					
Athlete	Event	Rope	Hoop	Ball	Clubs	Total	Rank	Rope	Hoop	Ball	Clubs	Total	Rank
Maria Kitkarska	Girls' individual all-around	21.200	21.050	22.250	22.550	87.050	11	Did not advance					

Team

Athlete	Event	Qualification				Final			
Athlete	Event	Hoops	Ribbons	Total	Rank	Hoops	Ribbons	Total	Rank
Katrina Cameron; Melodie Omidi; Anjelika Reznik; Victoria Reznik	Girls' group all-around	20.850	20.300	41.150	4 Q	21.775	21.650	43.425	Bronze medal

=== Trampoline ===
Athlete	Event	Qualification				Final	
Athlete	Event	Routine 1	Routine 2	Total	Rank	Routine 1	Rank
Curtis Gerein	Boys' trampoline	26.500	35.900	62.400	8 Q	36.800	7
Mariah Madigan	Girls' trampoline	27.100	34.400	61.500	5 Q	35.600	4

== Judo ==
Canada qualified 1 judoka.

Individual

Athlete	Event	Round 1	Round 2	Round 3	Semifinals	Final	Rank
Athlete	Event	Opposition Result	Opposition Result	Opposition Result	Opposition Result	Opposition Result	Rank
Ecaterina Guica	Girls' -52 kg	Pop (ROU); L 011-101	Repechage; Giuffrida (ITA); L 000-012	Did not advance			13

Team

Team	Event	Round 1	Round 2	Semifinals	Final	Rank
Team	Event	Opposition Result	Opposition Result	Opposition Result	Opposition Result	Rank
Birmingham; Fahariya Takidine (COM); Ecaterina Guica (CAN); Song Chol Hyon (PRK); Neo Kapenko (BOT); Chin Jie Lim (SIN); Kadijah Maxwell (BAR); Krisztian Toth (HUN)	Mixed team	Cairo; L 2-5	Did not advance			9

== Sailing ==
Canada qualified 2 sailors.

One Person Dinghy

Athlete	Event	Race												Points	Rank
Athlete	Event	1	2	3	4	5	6	7	8	9	10	11	M*	Points	Rank
Sarah Douglas	Girls' Byte CII	13	~~16~~	10	15	16	9	11	11	11	4	~~OCS~~	1	101	10

Windsurfing

Athlete	Event	Race											Points	Rank
Athlete	Event	1	2	3	4	5	6	7	8	9	10	M*	Points	Rank
Audrey Caron	Girls' Techno 293	17	17	13	17	~~18~~	11	17	16	14	17	16	155	17

== Shooting ==
Canada qualified 1 shooter.

Pistol

Athlete	Event	Qualification		Final		
Athlete	Event	Score	Rank	Score	Total	Rank
Danielle Marcotte	Girls' 10m air pistol	374	5 Q	96.9	470.9	4

== Swimming ==
Boys

Athletes	Event	Heat		Semifinal		Final	
Athletes	Event	Time	Position	Time	Position	Time	Position
Chad Bobrosky	Boys' 200m freestyle	1:51.36	4 Q			1:50.86	4
Chad Bobrosky	Boys' 400m freestyle	3:55.51	3 Q			3:54.43	4
Chad Bobrosky	Boys' 200m backstroke	2:06.51	10			Did not advance	
Jeremy Bagshaw	Boys' 100m freestyle	52.54	26	Did not advance			
Jeremy Bagshaw	Boys' 200m freestyle	1:51.42	5 Q			1:50.67	Bronze medal
Jeremy Bagshaw	Boys' 400m freestyle	3:53.81	1 Q			3:55.81	5
Kyle McIntee	Boys' 200m butterfly	2:01.93	4 Q			2:01.20	6
Thomas Jobin	Boys' 100m butterfly	56.80	20	Did not advance			
Thomas Jobin	Boys' 200m butterfly	2:04.72	12			Did not advance	
Chad Bobrosky; Kyle McIntee; Thomas Jobin; Jeremy Bagshaw	Boys' 4 × 100 m freestyle relay	3:28.91	8 Q			3:28.68	8
Chad Bobrosky; Kyle McIntee; Thomas Jobin; Jeremy Bagshaw	Boys' 4 × 100 m medley relay	3:58.65	12			Did not advance	

Girls

Athletes	Event	Heat		Semifinal		Final	
Athletes	Event	Time	Position	Time	Position	Time	Position
Lauren Earp	Girls' 50m freestyle	26.96	13 Q	26.62	11	Did not advance	
Lauren Earp	Girls' 100m freestyle	57.09	3 Q	56.79	4 Q	56.59	Bronze medal
Lauren Earp	Girls' 200m freestyle	2:06.10	17			Did not advance	
Lauren Earp	Girls' 400m freestyle	4:26.47	13			Did not advance	
Lindsay Delmar	Girls' 50m butterfly	28.17	7 Q	28.02	8 Q	27.54	5
Lindsay Delmar	Girls' 100m butterfly	1:00.69	1 Q	1:00.62	2 Q	1:00.37	5
Lindsay Delmar	Girls' 200m butterfly	2:14.86	6 Q			2:15.01	7
Rachel Nicol	Girls' 50m breaststroke	32.16	1 Q	32.13	1 Q	32.06	Gold medal
Rachel Nicol	Girls' 100m breaststroke	1:09.87	1 Q	1:09.22	1 Q	1:09.18	Bronze medal
Rachel Nicol	Girls' 200m breaststroke	2:31.57	2 Q			2:29.87	4
Tera van Beilen	Girls' 100m breaststroke	1:11.24	4 Q	1:09.93	3 Q	1:08.59	Gold medal
Tera van Beilen	Girls' 200m breaststroke	2:32.20	4 Q			2:29.39	Silver medal
Lindsay Delmar; Lauren Earp; Tera van Beilen; Rachel Nicol	Girls' 4 × 100 m freestyle relay	3:54.33	3 Q			3:49.12	Bronze medal
Lindsay Delmar; Lauren Earp; Tera van Beilen; Rachel Nicol	Girls' 4 × 100 m medley relay	4:17.94	5 Q			4:16.72	4

Mixed

Athletes	Event	Heat		Semifinal		Final	
Athletes	Event	Time	Position	Time	Position	Time	Position
Chad Bobrosky; Lauren Earp; Lindsay Delmar; Jeremy Bagshaw	Mixed 4 × 100 m freestyle relay	3:36.80	2 Q			3:36.05	4
Rachel Nicol*; Chad Bobrosky; Lindsay Delmar; Jeremy Bagshaw; Tera van Beilen	Mixed 4 × 100 m medley relay	4:02.69	6 Q			4:02.22	5

- * raced in heats only

== Taekwondo ==
Canada qualified 2 taekwondo athletes.

Athlete	Event	Preliminary	Quarterfinal	Semifinal	Final	Rank
Stefan Bozalo	Boys' +73kg		Christian Ocampo (PER); W 8-0	Ibrahim Ahmadsei (GER); L 3-4	Did not advance	Bronze medal
Melanie Phan	Girls' -49kg	Nour Abdelsalam (EGY); W 7-1	Nur Zakirah Zakaria (SIN); W 15-6	Worawong Pongpanit (THA); L 4-4+	Did not advance	Bronze medal

== Tennis ==
Canada qualified 3 tennists.

singles

Athlete	Event	Round 1	Round 2	Quarterfinals	Semifinals	Final	Rank
Pavel Krainik	Boys' singles	Huang (TPE); L 0-2 (0-6, 1-6)	Consolation; Fucsovics (HUN); W 2-0 (w/o)	Consolation; Micov (MKD); L 0-2 (3-4, RET)	Did not advance		
Katarena Paliivets	Girls' singles	Grage (DEN); L 0-2 (4-6, 4-6)	Consolation; Eskenazi (ARG); W 2-0 (w/o)	Consolation; Mutaguchi (JPN); L 0-2 (0-3, RET)	Did not advance		
Marianne Jodoin	Girls' singles	Mestach (BEL); L 0-2 (2-6, 0-6)	Consolation; Tan (SIN); W 2-0 (6-4, 7-5)	Consolation; Radulovic (MNE); W 2-0 (w/o)	Consolation; Ishizu (JPN); L 0-2 (1-6, 6-7)	Did not advance	

doubles

Athlete	Event	Round 1	Quarterfinals	Semifinals	Final	Rank
Darian King (BAR); Pavel Krainik (CAN)	Boys' doubles	Baluda (RUS); Biryukov (RUS); L 0-2 (4-6, 3-6)	Did not advance			
Marianne Jodoin (CAN); Katarena Paliivets (CAN)	Girls' doubles	Grage (DEN); Kremen (BLR); L 0-2 (1-6, 6-7)	Did not advance			

== Triathlon ==
Girls

Triathlete	Event	Swimming	Transit 1	Cycling	Transit 2	Running	Total time	Rank
Christine Ridenour	Individual	9:28	0:33	34:28	0:25	19:13	1:04:07.56	14

Men's

Athlete	Event	Swim (1.5 km)	Trans 1	Bike (40 km)	Trans 2	Run (10 km)	Total	Rank
Brook Powell	Individual	8:50	0:32	30:00	0:25	Did not finish		

Mixed

Athlete	Event	Total times per athlete (swim 250 m, bike 7 km, run 1.7 km)	Total group time	Rank
Christine Ridenour (CAN); Luis Oliveros (MEX); Andrea Longueira (CHI); Juan Andrade (ECU)	Mixed team relay Americas 2	20:21; 18:47; 23:07; 20:15	1:22:30.15	5

== Weightlifting ==
Canada qualified 1 weightlifter.

Athlete	Event	Snatch	Clean & jerk	Total	Rank
Prabdeep Sanghera	Girls' +63kg	82	93	175	11

== Wrestling ==
Canada qualified 3 wrestlers.

Freestyle

Athlete	Event	Pools		Final	Rank
Athlete	Event	Groups	Rank	Final	Rank
Dalton Webb	Boys' 76kg	Ergashev (UZB); L 0–2 (0–3, 0–6)	4	7th place match Aguon (GUM); W Fall (4–0)	7
Dalton Webb	Boys' 76kg	Hushtyn (BLR); L 0–2 (1–6, 0–7)	4	7th place match Aguon (GUM); W Fall (4–0)	7
Dalton Webb	Boys' 76kg	Kalayci (TUR); L 0–2 (0–4, 1–6)	4	7th place match Aguon (GUM); W Fall (4–0)	7
Parmvir Dhesi	Boys' 100kg	Schutte (RSA); W 2–0 (2–0, 1–0)	3	5th place match Enkhtugs (MGL); L 1–2 (1+–1, 0–2, 0-2)	6
Parmvir Dhesi	Boys' 100kg	Kadian (IND); L 0–2 (0–1, 0–1)	3	5th place match Enkhtugs (MGL); L 1–2 (1+–1, 0–2, 0-2)	6
Parmvir Dhesi	Boys' 100kg	Ruano (CUB); L 0–2 (0–1, 0–3)	3	5th place match Enkhtugs (MGL); L 1–2 (1+–1, 0–2, 0-2)	6
Dorothy Yeats	Girls' 70kg	Stankova (UKR); W 2–0 (3–1, 1–0)	1	Moon (KOR); W Fall (6–0)	Gold medal
Dorothy Yeats	Girls' 70kg	Kuenz (AUT); W 2–0 (1–0, 1–0)	1	Moon (KOR); W Fall (6–0)	Gold medal
Dorothy Yeats	Girls' 70kg	Nemeth (HUN); W 2–0 (1–0, 4–0)	1	Moon (KOR); W Fall (6–0)	Gold medal
