= Swimming at the 2010 Summer Youth Olympics – Girls' 4 × 100 metre medley relay =

Girls' 4 × 100 metre medley relay at the 2010 Summer Youth Olympics
- Venue: Singapore Sports School
- Dates: 16 August 2010
- Competitors: 40 from 10 nations
- Winning time: 4:09.68

Medalists
gold medal	Zoe Johnson; Emma McKeon; Emily Selig; Madi Wilson	Australia
silver medal	Ekaterina Andreeva; Olga Detenyuk; Kristina Kochetkova; Alexandra Papusha	Russia
bronze medal	Dorte Baumert; Lena Kalla; Lina Rathsack; Juliane Reinhold	Germany

The girls' 4 × 100 metre medley relay event at the 2010 Youth Olympic Games took place on 16 August 2010 at the Singapore Sports School.

== Medalists ==
Australia	4:09.68
Russia	4:11.07
Germany	4:11.76

== Heats ==
=== Heat 1 ===
Rank	Lane	Nationality	Time	Notes
1	4	Australia	4:13.12	Q
2	3	Germany	4:13.38	Q
3	6	Japan	4:19.00	Q
4	2	South Africa	4:24.41	Q
5	5	Brazil	4:25.66	Q

=== Heat 2 ===
Rank	Lane	Nationality	Time	Notes
1	2	Russia	4:13.43	Q
2	3	China	4:13.63	Q
3	4	Canada	4:17.94	Q
4	7	United States	4:26.15	
5	5	Singapore	4:28.56	
	6	Italy		DNS

== Final ==
Rank	Lane	Nationality	Time	Notes
1st place, gold medalist(s)	4	Australia	4:09.68	
2nd place, silver medalist(s)	3	Russia	4:11.07	
3rd place, bronze medalist(s)	5	Germany	4:11.76	
4	2	Canada	4:16.72	
5	7	Japan	4:16.80	
6	1	South Africa	4:23.52	
7	8	Brazil	4:24.62	
	6	China		DSQ
