= Swimming at the 2010 Summer Youth Olympics – Girls' 200 metre individual medley =

The girl's 200 metre individual medley event at the 2010 Youth Olympic Games took place on August 15, at the Singapore Sports School.

== Medalists ==
Gold	Kaitlyn Jones; United States	2:14.53
Silver	Kristina Kochetkova; Russia	2:15.13
Bronze	Barbora Závadová; Czech Republic	2:15.36

== Heats ==
=== Heat 1 ===
Rank	Lane	Name	Nationality	Time	Notes
1	3	Zeineb Khalfallah	Tunisia	2:23.81	
2	5	Karen Vilorio	Honduras	2:29.42	
3	4	Nibal Yamout	Lebanon	2:32.23	

=== Heat 2 ===
Rank	Lane	Name	Nationality	Time	Notes
1	4	Kristina Kochetkova	Russia	2:15.73	Q
2	5	Kaitlyn Jones	United States	2:16.57	Q
3	3	Julia Gerotto	Brazil	2:21.90	
4	6	Emily Selig	Australia	2:22.15	
5	2	Maria Carolina da Costa Rosa	Portugal	2:24.23	
-	1	Wei Li Lai	Malaysia		DSQ
-	7	Karla Yolanda Rafaela Toscano López	Guatemala		DSQ

=== Heat 3 ===
Rank	Lane	Name	Nationality	Time	Notes
1	3	Barbora Závadová	Czech Republic	2:17.74	Q
2	4	Stefania Pirozzi	Italy	2:20.94	Q
3	7	Gizem Bozkurt	Turkey	2:21.40	Q
4	6	Martina Elhenicka	Czech Republic	2:21.68	
5	5	Hyejin Kim	South Korea	2:22.78	
6	2	Ting Chen	Chinese Taipei	2:23.04	
7	1	Inga Elin Cryer	Iceland	2:25.12	
8	8	Bryndis Run Hansen	Iceland	2:28.10	

=== Heat 4 ===
Rank	Lane	Name	Nationality	Time	Notes
1	5	Chloe Francis	New Zealand	2:16.96	Q
2	4	Ekaterina Andreeva	Russia	2:17.10	Q
3	3	Jordan Mattern	United States	2:19.55	Q
4	6	Jolien Vermeylen	Belgium	2:22.66	
5	2	Ratna Marita	Indonesia	2:23.92	
6	8	Oneida Cooper	South Africa	2:27.82	
7	1	Renee Stothard	New Zealand	2:31.22	
-	7	Juanita Barreto	Colombia	-	DSQ

== Final ==
Rank	Lane	Name	Nationality	Time	Notes
1st place, gold medalist(s)	5	Kaitlyn Jones	United States	2:14.53	
2nd place, silver medalist(s)	4	Kristina Kochetkova	Russia	2:15.13	
3rd place, bronze medalist(s)	2	Barbora Závadová	Czech Republic	2:15.36	
4	6	Ekaterina Andreeva	Russia	2:17.37	
5	3	Chloe Francis	New Zealand	2:17.62	
6	7	Jordan Mattern	United States	2:19.70	
7	1	Stefania Pirozzi	Italy	2:19.91	
8	8	Gizem Bozkurt	Turkey	2:20.00	
