= Swimming at the 2010 Summer Youth Olympics – Mixed 4 × 100 metre medley relay =

Event at the 2010 Youth Olympics

The mixed 4 × 100 metre medley relay event at the 2010 Youth Olympic Games took place on August 20, at the Singapore Sports School.

== Medalists ==
China	3:52.52
Russia	3:55.29
Australia	3:55.63

== Heats ==
=== Heat 1 ===
Rank	Lane	Nationality	Time	Notes
1	5	China	3:56.78	Q
2	2	Spain	4:07.05	
3	4	Hong Kong	4:14.66	
4	6	Serbia	4:21.02	
	3	Italy		DNS

=== Heat 2 ===
Rank	Lane	Nationality	Time	Notes
1	6	Russia	4:00.67	Q
2	4	France	4:00.82	Q
3	5	Canada	4:02.69	Q
4	7	United States	4:04.29	Q
5	2	South Africa	4:06.14	
6	3	Iceland	4:18.81	

=== Heat 3 ===
Rank	Lane	Nationality	Time	Notes
1	4	Australia	3:59.14	Q
2	3	Germany	4:02.56	Q
3	6	Japan	4:06.13	Q
4	5	Brazil	4:08.25	
5	2	Singapore	4:08.94	
6	7	Trinidad and Tobago	4:20.21	

== Final ==
Rank	Lane	Nationality	Time	Notes
1st place, gold medalist(s)	4	China	3:52.52	
2nd place, silver medalist(s)	3	Russia	3:55.29	
3rd place, bronze medalist(s)	5	Australia	3:55.63	
4	6	France	3:56.64	
5	7	Canada	4:02.22	
6	1	United States	4:02.90	
7	8	Japan	4:06.18	
	2	Germany		DSQ
