= Swimming at the 2010 Summer Youth Olympics – Boys' 4 × 100 metre freestyle relay =

The boys' 4 × 100 metre freestyle relay event at the 2010 Youth Olympic Games took place on August 17, at the Singapore Sports School.

== Medalists ==
Russia	3:23.91
China	3:24.46
South Africa	3:24.66

== Heats ==
=== Heat 1 ===
Rank	Lane	Nationality	Time	Notes
1	3	China	3:27.11	Q
1	7	United States	3:27.11	Q
3	2	Russia	3:27.21	Q
4	5	Singapore	3:28.66	Q
5	4	Canada	3:28.91	Q
	6	Italy		DNS

=== Heat 2 ===
Rank	Lane	Nationality	Time	Notes
1	4	Australia	3:25.91	Q
2	7	South Africa	3:26.98	Q
3	5	France	3:27.19	Q
4	6	Germany	3:30.35	
5	2	Japan	3:32.20	
6	3	Brazil	3:32.64	

== Final ==
Rank	Lane	Nationality	Time	Notes
1st place, gold medalist(s)	7	Russia	3:23.91	
2nd place, silver medalist(s)	3	China	3:24.46	
3rd place, bronze medalist(s)	5	South Africa	3:24.66	
4	4	Australia	3:25.51	
5	6	United States	3:25.56	
6	2	France	3:25.63	
7	1	Singapore	3:27.46	
8	8	Canada	3:28.68	
