= Fencing at the 2010 Summer Youth Olympics – Mixed team =

== Mixed team event ==
For 2010 YOG FIE introduced completely new format competitions for teams, where their composition will be determined by the results achieved during the individual events. The best fencers ranked in each weapon from different NOCs will form the top team of each continent as follows: Europe 1, Europe 2, Europe 3, Europe 4, Asia 1, Asia 2, Americas 1, Americas 2, Africa.

Team	Female épée	Male épée	Female foil	Male foil	Female saber	Male saber	Average fencers rank	Initial Team rank
Europe 1	Santuccio Alberta (2) (ITA)	Fichera Marco (1) (ITA)	Mancini Camilla (1) (ITA)	Luperi Edoardo (1) (ITA)	Egoryan Yana (1) (RUS)	Affede Leonardo (2) (ITA)	1.33	1
Europe 2	Swatowska Martyna (3) (POL)	Bodoczi Nikolaus (2) (GER)	Alekseeva Victoria (2) (RUS)	Babaoglu Tevfik Burak (4) (TUR)	Musch Anja (3) (GER)	Hubers Richard (3) (GER)	2.83	2
Europe 3	BAKHAREVA Yulia (5) (RUS)	Kruk Tomasz (6) (POL)	Lupkovics Dora (3) (HUN)	Lichagin Kirill (5) (RUS)	Komaschuk Alina (4) (UKR)	Akula Mikhail (4) (BLR)	4.5	5
Europe 4	TATARAN Amalia (7) (ROU)	Ciovica Lucian (7) (ROU)	Cellerova Michala (7) (SVK)	Alexander Choupenitch (6) (CZE)	BOUDAD Kenza (7) (FRA)	Zatko Arthur (5) (FRA)	6.5	6
Asia 1	Lin Sheng (1) (CHN)	NA Byeong Hun (4) (KOR)	Wong Ye Ying Liane (6) (SIN)	Lee Kwang Hyun (3) (KOR)	Seo Ji Yeon (5) (KOR)	Jong Hun Song (1) (KOR)	4.33	4
Asia 2	Lee Hye Won (6) (KOR)	Zhakupov Kirill (5) (KAZ)	Wang Lianlian (8) (CHN)	CHOI Nicholas Edward (9) (HKG)	Wan Yini (6) (CHN)	Wang Jackson (11) (HKG)	7.5	7
Americas 1	Holmes Katharine (4) (USA)	Lyssov Alexandre (3) (CAN)	Goldie Allana (4) (CAN)	Massilas Alexander (2) (USA)	Merza Celina (2) (USA)	Spear Will (6) (USA)	3.5	3
Americas 2	Di Tella Clara Isabel (10) (ARG)	Melargno Guilherme (11) (BRA)	Shaito Mona (5) (USA)	PRADES ROSABAL Redys Hanners (11) (CUB)	Maria Carreno (11) (VEN)	Breult-Mallette Miguel (10) (CAN)	9.66	8
Africa	MATSHAYA Wanda (11) (RSA)	Saleh Saleh (10) (EGY)	Daw Menatalla (9) (EGY)	Mahmoud Mostafa (10) (EGY)	Ahmed Mennatalla Yasser (8) (EGY)	Elsyssy Ziad (12) (EGY)	10	9

== Bracket ==
Round of 16
1	EUROPE 1
16	BYE
9	AMERICAS 2	28
8	AFRICA	25
5	EUROPE 3
12	BYE
13	BYE
4	AMERICAS 1
3	ASIA-OCEANIA 1
14	BYE
11	BYE
6	EUROPE 4
7	ASIA-OCEANIA 2
10	BYE
15	BYE
2	EUROPE 2

Quarterfinals
1	EUROPE 1	30
9	AMERICAS 2	17
5	EUROPE 3	28
4	AMERICAS 1	30
3	ASIA-OCEANIA 1	30
6	EUROPE 4	24
7	ASIA-OCEANIA 2	21
2	EUROPE 2	30

Semifinals
1	EUROPE 1	30
4	AMERICAS 1	25
3	ASIA-OCEANIA 1	27
2	EUROPE 2	30

Final
1	EUROPE 1	30
2	EUROPE 2	24

Bronze Medal
4	AMERICAS 1	30
3	ASIA-OCEANIA 1	24

Classification 5-8
AMERICAS 2	23
EUROPE 3	30
EUROPE 4	30
ASIA-OCEANIA 2	20

Placement 5-6-7-8
EUROPE 3	29
EUROPE 4	30
Placement 7-8
AMERICAS 2	28
ASIA-OCEANIA 2	27
