= Bai Anqi =

Chinese swimmer (born 1993)

Personal information
- National team: China
- Born: January 9, 1993 (age 33) Anji, China

Sport
- Sport: Swimming
- Strokes: Backstroke
Medal record
Representing China
Summer Youth Olympics
Gold medal – first place	2010 Singapore	200m backstroke
Gold medal – first place	2010 Singapore	4x100m freestyle relay
Gold medal – first place	2010 Singapore	Mixed 4x100m freestyle relay
Gold medal – first place	2010 Singapore	Mixed 4x100m medley relay
Silver medal – second place	2010 Singapore	100m backstroke

Bai Anqi (born 9 January 1993; Chinese: 白安琪) is a Chinese backstroke swimmer. She competed at the 2012 Summer Olympics, where she did not qualify for the semifinals, after finishing in seventeenth position in the qualifiers, with a time of 2:11:26, the sixth-fastest in her heat of the 200 m backstroke.

== Personal life ==
Bai Anqi was born on 9 January 1993 in Anji, Zhejiang, in the east of the People's Republic of China. She was born as Chinese: 白 安琪. Her nickname is "White Angel" as what her name translates to when translated to English. Bai's hobbies include listening to music and going on the internet. The only language she speaks is Chinese, and she is currently a student. Bai is 164 centimetres (65 inches) tall and weighs 59 kilograms (130 pounds).

== Swimming ==
Bai is coached by Shi Xiaoming and Xu Guoyi in swimming. She currently swims in the Zhejiang Province Swimming Team, and swims backstroke. She swims in the women's 200m backstroke event in swimming. She did not qualify for the 2012 Summer Olympics held in London, after finishing in nineteenth position in the qualifiers, with a time of 2:11.26. She was three positions away from qualifying for the 200m backstroke event at the London Olympic Games, but, reached the highest position for a Chinese swimmer in the qualifiers of this event. It took her 31.02 seconds to reach the 50 metre mark, 1:04.51 to reach the one hundred metre mark, 1 minute 37.88 seconds to reach the 150 mark, then 2:11:26 to finish the qualifiers. In the qualifying heats, she was sixth position in her heat, but could not qualify. Her reaction time in the qualifying heat was 0.54 seconds.

== See also ==
- China at the 2012 Summer Olympics - Swimming
