= Swimming at the 2010 Summer Youth Olympics – Boys' 200 metre breaststroke =

The men's 200 metre breaststroke heats and semifinals at the 2010 Youth Olympic Games took place on August 17 and the final took place on August 18 at the Singapore Sports School.

== Medalists ==
Gold	Flavio Bizzarri; Italy	2:13.31
Silver	Anton Lobanov; Russia	2:13.65
Bronze	Nicholas Schafer; Australia	2:13.72

== Heats ==
=== Heat 1 ===
Rank	Lane	Name	Nationality	Time	Notes
1	4	Panagiotis Samilidis	Greece	2:19.15	Q
2	5	Yannick Kaeser	Switzerland	2:19.78	
3	3	Eduardo Solaeche	Spain	2:20.80	
4	2	Lachezar Shumkov	Bulgaria	2:21.34	
5	6	Tatsunari Shoda	Japan	2:21.54	
6	7	Wassim Elloumi	Tunisia	2:26.92	

=== Heat 2 ===
Rank	Lane	Name	Nationality	Time	Notes
1	5	Nicholas Schafer	Australia	2:14.64	Q
2	4	Nuttapong Ketin	Thailand	2:17.05	Q
3	3	Alexey Atsapkin	Russia	2:18.06	Q
4	6	Matti Mattsson	Finland	2:18.64	Q
5	2	Dmitriy Shvetsov	Uzbekistan	2:20.93	
6	1	Emmanuel Antonio Ramirez Aponte	Puerto Rico	2:29.91	
7	7	Seiji Groome	Cayman Islands	2:36.75	

=== Heat 3 ===
Rank	Lane	Name	Nationality	Time	Notes
1	5	Anton Lobanov	Russia	2:17.60	Q
2	4	Christian vom Lehn	Germany	2:17.65	Q
3	3	Flavio Bizzarri	Italy	2:18.22	Q
4	2	Dmitrii Aleksandrov	Kyrgyzstan	2:20.52	
5	6	Thomas Rabeisen	France	2:20.77	
6	7	Hrafn Traustason	Iceland	2:28.08	
7	1	Tsilavina Ramanantsoa	Madagascar	2:38.41	

== Final ==
Rank	Lane	Name	Nationality	Time	Notes
1st place, gold medalist(s)	2	Flavio Bizzarri	Italy	2:13.31	
2nd place, silver medalist(s)	3	Anton Lobanov	Russia	2:13.65	
3rd place, bronze medalist(s)	4	Nicholas Schafer	Australia	2:13.72	
4	6	Christian vom Lehn	Germany	2:16.03	
5	1	Panagiotis Samilidis	Greece	2:17.36	
6	8	Yannick Kaeser	Switzerland	2:17.78	
7	5	Nuttapong Ketin	Thailand	2:17.93	
8	7	Matti Mattsson	Finland	2:18.47	
