= Swimming at the 2010 Summer Youth Olympics – Mixed 4 × 100 metre freestyle relay =

The mixed 4 × 100 metre freestyle relay event at the 2010 Youth Olympic Games took place on August 15, at the Singapore Sports School.

== Medalists ==
China	3:31.34
Australia	3:31.69
France	3:35.90

== Heats ==
=== Heat 1 ===
Rank	Lane	Nationality	Time	Notes
1	5	China	3:39.39	Q
2	4	Hong Kong	3:40.34	Q
3	6	Serbia	3:41.15	
4	3	Italy	3:42.44	
-	2	Spain	-	DSQ

=== Heat 2 ===
Rank	Lane	Nationality	Time	Notes
1	5	Canada	3:36.80	Q
2	4	France	3:37.03	Q
3	7	United States	3:38.89	Q
4	6	Russia	3:39.69	Q
5	2	South Africa	3:43.85	
6	3	Iceland	3:49.60	

=== Heat 3 ===
Rank	Lane	Nationality	Time	Notes
1	4	Australia	3:34.67	Q
2	3	Germany	3:38.69	Q
3	5	Brazil	3:41.07	
4	2	Singapore	3:42.88	
5	6	Japan	3:49.23	
6	7	Trinidad and Tobago	3:51.35	

== Final ==
Rank	Lane	Nationality	Time	Notes
1st place, gold medalist(s)	7	China	3:31.34	
2nd place, silver medalist(s)	4	Australia	3:31.69	
3rd place, bronze medalist(s)	3	France	3:35.90	
4	5	Canada	3:36.05	
5	6	Germany	3:36.06	
6	2	United States	3:39.08	
7	8	Hong Kong	3:40.08	
8	1	Russia	3:42.63	
