= Gymnastics at the 2010 Summer Youth Olympics – Women's vault =

These are the results of the women's vault competition, one of five events for female competitors of the artistic gymnastics discipline contested in the gymnastics at the 2010 Summer Youth Olympics in Singapore. The qualification and final rounds took place on August 16 at the Bishan Sports Hall.

== Medalists ==
Gold	Silver	Bronze
Viktoria Komova; Russia	Maria Vargas; Spain	Carlotta Ferlito; Italy

== Results ==
=== Qualification ===
42 gymnasts competed in the vault event in the artistic gymnastics qualification round on August 16. The eight highest scoring gymnasts advanced to the final on August 21.

=== Final ===
Rank	Gymnast	#	A-score	B-score	Penalty	Average	Total
Gold medal	Viktoria Komova (RUS)	1	6.5	9.100	—	15.600	15.312
Gold medal	Viktoria Komova (RUS)	2	5.8	9.225	—	15.025	15.312
Silver medal	Maria Vargas (ESP)	1	4.4	9.150	—	13.550	13.800
Silver medal	Maria Vargas (ESP)	2	5.0	9.050	—	14.050	13.800
Bronze medal	Carlotta Ferlito (ITA)	1	5.0	8.900	—	13.900	13.700
Bronze medal	Carlotta Ferlito (ITA)	2	4.4	9.100	—	13.500	13.700
4	Natsumi Sasada (JPN)	1	5.0	8.875	—	13.875	13.662
4	Natsumi Sasada (JPN)	2	4.4	9.050	—	13.450	13.662
5	Madeline Gardiner (CAN)	1	5.0	8.600	—	13.600	13.587
5	Madeline Gardiner (CAN)	2	4.7	8.875	—	13.575	13.587
6	Harumy Freitas (BRA)	1	5.0	8.525	—	13.525	13.425
6	Harumy Freitas (BRA)	2	4.4	8.925	—	13.325	13.425
7	Diana Bulimar (ROU)	1	5.0	8.450	—	13.450	13.412
7	Diana Bulimar (ROU)	2	4.6	8.775	—	13.375	13.412
8	Bianka S. Mityko (HUN)	1	4.4	8.925	—	13.325	13.237
8	Bianka S. Mityko (HUN)	2	4.6	8.550	—	13.150	13.237
