= Gymnastics at the 2010 Summer Youth Olympics – Women's uneven bars =

These are the results of the women's uneven bars competition, one of five events for female competitors of the artistic gymnastics discipline contested in the gymnastics at the 2010 Summer Youth Olympics in Singapore. The qualification and final rounds took place on August 17 at the Bishan Sports Hall.

== Medalists ==
Gold	Silver	Bronze
Viktoria Komova; Russia	Tan Sixin; China	Jonna Adlerteg; Sweden

== Results ==
=== Qualification ===
41 gymnasts competed in the uneven bars event in the artistic gymnastics qualification round on August 17. The eight highest scoring gymnasts advanced to the final on August 21.

=== Final ===
Rank	Gymnast	A-score	B-score	Penalty	Total
Gold medal	Viktoria Komova (RUS)	6.5	8.025	—	14.525
Silver medal	Tan Sixin (CHN)	6.5	7.625	—	14.125
Bronze medal	Jonna Adlerteg (SWE)	5.1	8.450	—	13.550
4	Angela Donald (AUS)	5.0	7.975	—	12.975
5	Tess Moonen (NED)	5.0	7.725	—	12.725
6	Carlotta Ferlito (ITA)	5.2	7.525	—	12.725
7	Diana Bulimar (ROU)	5.0	7.525	—	12.725
8	Madeline Gardiner (CAN)	2.5	7.400	—	9.900
