= Canoeing at the 2010 Summer Youth Olympics – Boys' C1 slalom =

These are the results of the Boys' C1 Slalom at the 2010 Summer Youth Olympics. It took place at the Marina Reservoir. Time Trial Round was on August 24, 2010. First elimination round, repechage and third round took place on August 24, and quarterfinals, semifinals and medals rounds were on August 25.

== Medalists ==
| Gold | Xiaodong Wang; China |
| Silver | Dennis Soeter; Germany |
| Bronze | Anatolii Melnyk; Ukraine |

== Time Trial ==
| Rank | Athlete | Time |
|---|---|---|
| 1 | Xiaodong Wang (CHN) | 1:32.61 |
| 2 | Dennis Soeter (GER) | 1:39.39 |
| 3 | Hayden Daniels (CAN) | 1:45.96 |
| 4 | Anatolii Melnyk (UKR) | 1:47.62 |
| 5 | Isaquias Queiroz (BRA) | 1:51.20 |
| 6 | Patryk Sokol (POL) | 1:56.89 |
| 7 | Radoslav Kutsev (AZE) | 1:57.56 |
| 8 | Edgar Babayan (ARM) | 1:58.88 |
| 9 | Matija Burisa (CRO) | 2:01.84 |
| 10 | Andrei Liferi (ROU) | 2:02.92 |
| 11 | Osvaldo Sacerio Cardenas (CUB) | 2:10.68 |
| 12 | Timofey Yemelyanov (KAZ) | 2:12.15 |
| 13 | Jose Chimbumba (ANG) | 2:22.54 |
| 14 | Alexey Volgin (RUS) | 2:48.65 |
| | Alexandru Tiganu (MDA) | DSQ |
| | Pedro Castaneda (MEX) | DSQ |

== First round ==
The winners advanced to the 3rd round. Losers raced at the repechages.

Match 1

| Name | Time |
|---|---|
| Xiaodong Wang (CHN) | 1:33.91 |
| Alexey Volgin (RUS) | DNF |

Match 2

| Name | Time |
|---|---|
| Dennis Soeter (GER) | 1:43.02 |
| Jose Chimbumba (ANG) | 2:19.77 |

Match 3

| Name | Time |
|---|---|
| Hayden Daniels (CAN) | 1:45.46 |
| Timofey Yemelyanov (KAZ) | 2:08.96 |

Match 4

| Name | Time |
|---|---|
| Anatolii Melnyk (UKR) | 1:48.41 |
| Osvaldo Sacerio Cardenas (CUB) | 1:56.59 |

Match 5

| Name | Time |
|---|---|
| Isaquias Queiroz (BRA) | 1:53.23 |
| Andrei Liferi (ROU) | 2:01.73 |

Match 6

| Name | Time |
|---|---|
| Patryk Sokol (POL) | 1:54.90 |
| Matija Burisa (CRO) | 1:39.46 |

Match 7

| Name | Time |
|---|---|
| Radoslav Kutsev (AZE) | 1:54.31 |
| Edgar Babayan (ARM) | 2:06.43 |

== Repechage ==
The winners and fastest 2 losers advanced to the 3rd round.

Repechage 1

| Name | Time |
|---|---|
| Matija Burisa (CRO) | 1:59.26 |
| Jose Chimbumba (ANG) | 2:19.23 |

Repechage 2

| Name | Time |
|---|---|
| Osvaldo Sacerio Cardenas (CUB) | 2:02.69 |
| Timofey Yemelyanov (KAZ) | DSQ |

Repechage 3

| Name | Time |
|---|---|
| Andrei Liferi (ROU) | 2:00.19 |
| Edgar Babayan (ARM) | 2:06.94 |

== Third round ==
The winners and two fastest losers advanced to the quarterfinals.

Match 1

| Name | Time |
|---|---|
| Xiaodong Wang (CHN) | 1:34.98 |
| Jose Chimbumba (ANG) | 2:21.23 |

Match 2

| Name | Time |
|---|---|
| Dennis Soeter (GER) | 1:39.44 |
| Edgar Babayan (ARM) | 2:08.22 |

Match 3

| Name | Time |
|---|---|
| Hayden Daniels (CAN) | 1:47.73 |
| Osvaldo Sacerio Cardenas (CUB) | 2:06.33 |

Match 4

| Name | Time |
|---|---|
| Anatolii Melnyk (UKR) | 1:45.61 |
| Andrei Liferi (ROU) | 1:56.69 |

Match 5

| Name | Time |
|---|---|
| Isaquias Queiroz (BRA) | 1:51.66 |
| Matija Burisa (CRO) | 1:58.64 |

Match 6

| Name | Time |
|---|---|
| Radoslav Kutsev (AZE) | 1:53.53 |
| Patryk Sokol (POL) | 1:56.59 |

== Quarterfinals ==
The winners advanced to the semifinals.

Match 1

| Name | Time |
|---|---|
| Xiaodong Wang (CHN) | 1:36.07 |
| Andrei Liferi (ROU) | 2:07.68 |

Match 2

| Name | Time |
|---|---|
| Dennis Soeter (GER) | 1:40.23 |
| Patryk Sokol (POL) | 1:56.92 |

Match 3

| Name | Time |
|---|---|
| Anatolii Melnyk (UKR) | 1:48.36 |
| Radoslav Kutsev (AZE) | 1:59.31 |

Match 4

| Name | Time |
|---|---|
| Hayden Daniels (CAN) | 1:47.60 |
| Isaquias Queiroz (BRA) | DNF |

== Semifinals ==
The winners advanced to the finals, losers advanced to the bronze medal match.

Match 1

| Name | Time |
|---|---|
| Xiaodong Wang (CHN) | 1:36.60 |
| Anatolii Melnyk (UKR) | 1:53.81 |

Match 2

| Name | Time |
|---|---|
| Dennis Soeter (GER) | 1:42.93 |
| Hayden Daniels (CAN) | 1:48.94 |

== Finals ==
Gold Medal Match

| Rank | Name | Time |
|---|---|---|
| 1st place, gold medalist(s) | Xiaodong Wang (CHN) | 1:32.66 |
| 2nd place, silver medalist(s) | Dennis Soeter (GER) | 1:41.20 |

Bronze Medal Match

| Rank | Name | Time |
|---|---|---|
| 3rd place, bronze medalist(s) | Anatolii Melnyk (UKR) | 1:44.36 |
| 4 | Hayden Daniels (CAN) | 1:46.77 |
