= Shooting at the 2010 Summer Youth Olympics – Girls' 10 metre air pistol =

These are the results of the girls' 10m air pistol event at the 2010 Youth Olympic Games. The competition took place on August 23, with the qualification at 9:00 and the Finals at 12:00.

== Medalists ==
Gold	Jang Mi Kim; South Korea
Silver	Fang Xue; China
Bronze	Geraldine Kate Solorzano; Guatemala

== Qualification ==
Rank	Athlete	Series				Total	X	Shoot-off
Rank	Athlete	1	2	3	4	Total	X	Shoot-off
1	Jang Mi Kim (KOR)	95	93	95	95	378	10	
2	Fang Xue (CHN)	94	95	94	95	378	10	
3	Ekaterina Barsukova (RUS)	97	95	92	92	376	9	
4	Geraldine Kate Solorzano (GUA)	96	93	92	93	374	9	
5	Danielle Marcotte (CAN)	90	93	96	95	374	8	
6	Ruchi Singh (IND)	96	92	92	94	374	4	
7	Eliane Dohner (SUI)	94	95	92	92	373	7	
8	Chiara Marini (ITA)	92	97	94	90	373	5	
9	Lenaza Asanova (UZB)	92	96	92	91	371	3	
10	Alexandra Silvia Morar (ROU)	89	95	94	92	370	8	
11	Sarka Jonakova (CZE)	96	94	90	90	370	7	
12	Valentina Pereglin (CRO)	91	93	92	93	369	7	
13	Kanokkan Chaimongkol (THA)	92	96	89	91	368	9	
14	Hala Abdel Rahman (EGY)	91	92	92	93	368	3	
15	Emily Esposito (AUS)	93	91	95	88	367	7	
16	Yasaman Heidariboroujeni (IRI)	94	93	89	91	367	5	
17	Mariana Nava (MEX)	92	92	89	93	366	12	
18	Dijana Petrova (MKD)	92	88	93	90	363	7	
19	Thi Ngoc Duong Nguyen (VIE)	88	93	88	91	360	8	
20	Kseniya Faminykh (BLR)	91	16			107	2	DNF

== Final ==
Rank	Athlete	Quali	Series										Final	Total	Shoot-Off
Rank	Athlete	Quali	1	2	3	4	5	6	7	8	9	10	Final	Total	Shoot-Off
1st place, gold medalist(s)	Jang Mi Kim (KOR)	378	10.6	10.1	9.9	10.0	10.6	10.7	8.4	9.5	10.8	10.6	101.2	479.2	
2nd place, silver medalist(s)	Fang Xue (CHN)	378	9.2	10.0	9.3	9.1	9.3	10.5	8.4	8.6	9.1	10.0	93.5	471.5	10.8
3rd place, bronze medalist(s)	Geraldine Kate Solorzano (GUA)	374	10.0	10.6	10.5	10.0	10.7	10.2	8.2	7.5	9.8	10.0	97.5	471.5	10.1
4	Danielle Marcotte (CAN)	374	9.7	10.7	9.0	10.4	9.4	9.3	10.8	9.0	8.6	10.0	96.9	470.9	
5	Ekaterina Barsukova (RUS)	376	9.1	8.8	9.2	8.0	10.1	8.8	9.5	9.9	9.7	9.4	92.5	468.5	
6	Ruchi Singh (IND)	374	8.6	9.3	9.6	9.6	10.0	8.6	8.7	9.7	8.8	10.3	93.2	467.2	
7	Chiara Marini (ITA)	373	9.8	8.5	9.3	10.0	9.6	9.6	9.3	8.2	9.4	9.9	93.6	466.6	
8	Eliane Dohner (SUI)	373	8.2	8.2	8.4	9.3	10.5	9.2	9.1	5.8	8.3	9.3	86.3	459.3	
