= Iceland at the 2010 Summer Youth Olympics =

- IOC code: ISL
- NOC: Icelandic Olympic Committee
- Website: www.olympic.is

in Singapore
- Competitors: 6 in 1 sport
- Flag bearer: Hrafn Traustason
- Medals: Gold 0 Silver 0 Bronze 0 Total 0

Summer Youth Olympics appearances
- 2010; 2014; 2018

Iceland participated in the 2010 Summer Youth Olympics in Singapore.

The Iceland team consisted of 6 athletes competing in 1 sport: aquatics (swimming).

== Swimming ==
Boys

Athletes	Event	Heat		Semifinal		Final	
Athletes	Event	Time	Position	Time	Position	Time	Position
Anton Sveinn McKee	Boys’ 200m Freestyle	1:58.08	34			Did not advance	
Anton Sveinn McKee	Boys’ 400m Freestyle	4:12.80	27			Did not advance	
Hrafn Traustason	Boys’ 100m Breaststroke	1:07.97	25	Did not advance			
Hrafn Traustason	Boys’ 200m Breaststroke	2:28.08	17			Did not advance	

Girls

Athletes	Event	Heat		Semifinal		Final	
Athletes	Event	Time	Position	Time	Position	Time	Position
Ingibjörg Kristín Jónsdóttir	Girls’ 50m Freestyle	26.87	10 Q	26.47	9	Did not advance	
Ingibjörg Kristín Jónsdóttir	Girls’ 100m Freestyle	58.74	21	Did not advance			
Karen Sif Vilhjálmsdóttir	Girls’ 50m Freestyle	27.55	25	Did not advance			
Karen Sif Vilhjálmsdóttir	Girls’ 100m Freestyle	1:00.01	34	Did not advance			
Karen Sif Vilhjálmsdóttir	Girls’ 200m Freestyle	2:09.61	30			Did not advance	
Inga Elin Cryer	Girls’ 400m Freestyle	4:28.68	16			Did not advance	
Inga Elin Cryer	Girls’ 200m Individual Medley	2:25.12	18			Did not advance	
Bryndís Run Hansen	Girls’ 50m Butterfly	28.60	13 Q	28.53	13	Did not advance	
Bryndís Run Hansen	Girls’ 100m Butterfly	1:05.56	26	Did not advance			
Bryndís Run Hansen	Girls’ 200m Individual Medley	2:28.10	20			Did not advance	

Mixed

Athletes	Event	Heat		Semifinal		Final	
Athletes	Event	Time	Position	Time	Position	Time	Position
Anton Sveinn McKee; Ingibjörg Kristín Jónsdóttir; Hrafn Traustason; Karen Sif Vilhjálmsdóttir	Mixed 4 × 100 m Freestyle Relay	3:49.60	15			Did not advance	
Anton Sveinn McKee; Ingibjörg Kristín Jónsdóttir; Hrafn Traustason; Bryndís Run Hansen	Mixed 4 × 100 m Medley Relay	4:18.81	14			Did not advance	
