= Swimming at the 2010 Summer Youth Olympics – Girls' 4 × 100 metre freestyle relay =

The girls' 4 × 100 metre freestyle relay event at the 2010 Youth Olympic Games took place on August 19, at the Singapore Sports School.

== Medalists ==
China	3:46.64
Germany	3:49.02
Canada	3:49.12

== Heats ==
=== Heat 1 ===
Rank	Lane	Nationality	Time	Notes
1	3	Germany	3:54.31	Q
2	4	Australia	3:54.64	Q
3	5	Brazil	3:54.87	Q
4	7	United States	3:56.12	Q
	6	Italy		DNS
	2	Russia		DSQ

=== Heat 2 ===
Rank	Lane	Nationality	Time	Notes
1	3	China	3:54.12	Q
2	4	Canada	3:54.33	Q
3	6	Hungary	3:57.34	Q
4	5	Singapore	4:01.27	Q
5	7	South Africa	4:02.12	
6	2	Japan	4:02.29	

== Final ==
Rank	Lane	Nationality	Time	Notes
1st place, gold medalist(s)	4	China	3:46.64	
2nd place, silver medalist(s)	5	Germany	3:49.02	
3rd place, bronze medalist(s)	3	Canada	3:49.12	
4	6	Australia	3:51.81	
5	2	Brazil	3:52.86	
6	7	United States	3:54.26	
7	1	Hungary	3:56.42	
8	8	Singapore	4:00.43	
