= Rachel Nicol (swimmer) =

Canadian swimmer (born 1993)

Personal information
- National team: Canada
- Born: February 16, 1993 (age 33) Regina, Saskatchewan, Canada
- Height: 5 ft 2 in (157 cm)
- Weight: 134 lb (61 kg)

Sport
- Sport: Swimming
- Strokes: Breaststroke
- Club: Lethbridge Amateur Swim Club
- College team: Southern Methodist University
Medal record
Women's swimming
Representing Canada
World Championships (LC)
Bronze medal – third place	2022 Budapest	4×100 m medley
World Championships (SC)
Silver medal – second place	2016 Windsor	4×100 m medley
Bronze medal – third place	2022 Melbourne	4×100 m medley
Pan American Games
Silver medal – second place	2015 Toronto	4×100 m medley
Bronze medal – third place	2015 Toronto	100 m breastroke
Gold medal – first place	2023 Santiago	100 m breastroke
Gold medal – first place	2023 Santiago	4×100 m medley
Youth Olympic Games
Gold medal – first place	2010 Singapore	50 m breastroke
Bronze medal – third place	2010 Singapore	100 m breastroke
Bronze medal – third place	2010 Singapore	4×100 m freestyle

Rachel Nicol (born February 16, 1993) is a retired Canadian competitive swimmer, who competed primarily in the breaststroke events. Nicol won multiple medals for Canada in her career, highlighted by two gold medals at the 2023 Pan American Games in Santiago, Chile, as well as a bronze medal at the 2022 World Aquatics Championships.

== Career ==
In 2016, she qualified for the Canadian National team for the 2016 Summer Olympics in the 100m breaststroke after setting a new personal best of 1:06.88. At those Olympics in Rio, she finished 5th in the 100m breaststroke with a time of 1:06.68. Nicol was also part of Canada's 4 x 100m medley relay team, and they finished 5th.

In September 2017, Nicol was named to Canada's 2018 Commonwealth Games team.

Nicol medaled at the 2022 World Aquatics Championships as part of the Canadian team in the 4×100 m medley relay.

Nicol won two gold medals at the 2023 Pan American Games in Santiago, Chile, where she won the 100 m breaststroke event, and helped Canada win the 4 x 100 medley relay.

== Retirement and personal life ==
Nicol announced her retirement from swimming in January 2024.

She completed an undergraduate degree in applied physiology and sport management at Southern Methodist University, and then a masters degree in kinesiology at the University of Calgary (2022).
