= Noora Laukkanen =

Finnish swimmer

Personal information
- Born: February 3, 1993 (age 33) Helsinki, Finland

Sport
- Sport: Swimming
- Strokes: Medley
- Club: Oulun Uimarit-73, Oulu

Noora Laukkanen (born February 3, 1993, in) is a Finnish swimmer who competes in the Women's 400m Individual Medley. She competed at the 2012 Summer Olympics. She is a member of the Oulun Uimarit-73 club in Oulu.
