= Olga Detenyuk =

Russian swimmer

Personal information
- Full name: Olga Igoryevna Detenyuk
- National team: Russia
- Born: 23 June 1993 (age 33) Vladivostok, Russia
- Height: 1.73 m (5 ft 8 in)
- Weight: 57 kg (126 lb)

Sport
- Sport: Swimming
- Strokes: Breaststroke
Medal record
Women's swimming
Representing Russia
World Junior Championships
Gold medal – first place	2008 Monterrey	200 m breaststroke
European Junior Championships
Bronze medal – third place	2009 Prague	200 m breaststroke
Youth Olympic Games
Silver medal – second place	2010 Singapore	4×100 m medley

Olga Igoryevna Detenyuk (Russian: Ольга Игоревна Детенюк; born June 23, 1993) is a Russian swimmer, who specialized in breaststroke events. She represented her nation Russia, as a 15-year-old, at the 2008 Summer Olympics, and has claimed a full set of career medals in a major international competition, spanning the World and European Junior Championships and the inaugural 2010 Summer Youth Olympics in Singapore.

Detenyuk claimed her first title in the 200 m breaststroke at the 2008 FINA Youth World Swimming Championships in Monterrey, Mexico, demolishing a meet record of 2:25.19. Leading to her Olympic debut as a fifteen-year-old, she scored a second-place time of 2:26.15 just behind Yuliya Yefimova to assure a direct selection to the Olympic swimming team and slide strenuously under the FINA A-cut (2:28.20) at the Russian Championships on that same year in Moscow.

At the 2008 Summer Olympics in Beijing, Detenyuk competed as a lone Russian swimmer in the women's 200 m breaststroke. Swimming alongside Yefimova in heat four, Detenyuk tried to hold on with the top four leaders throughout the race, but faded down the stretch to take the seventh spot in 2:27.87. Detenyuk missed the semifinals by 0.6-second margin, sharing a twentieth-place tie with Great Britain's Kirsty Balfour in the prelims.

When Singapore hosted the inaugural 2010 Summer Youth Olympics in 2010, Detenyuk and her teammates Alexandra Papusha, Kristina Kochetkova, and Ekaterina Andreeva solidified their silver-medal finish in the girls' 4×100 m medley relay with a time of 4:11.07, trailing the victorious Aussie foursome by nearly two seconds.
