= Tera van Beilen =

Canadian swimmer (born 1993)

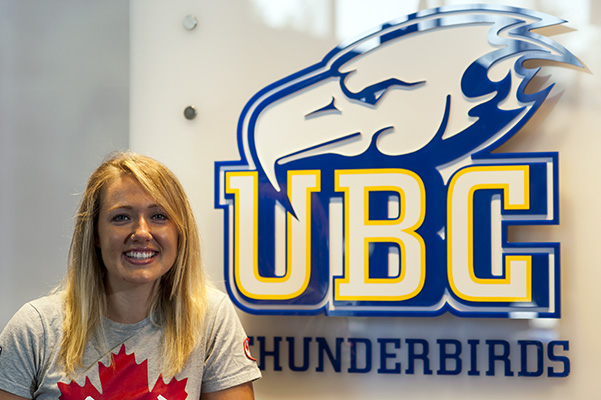
- Van Beilen in 2016

Personal information
- Nickname: "TVB"
- National team: Canada
- Born: March 30, 1993 (age 33) Mississauga, Ontario, Canada
- Height: 1.82 m (6 ft 0 in)
- Weight: 71 kg (157 lb)

Sport
- Sport: Swimming
- Strokes: Breaststroke
- Club: Oakville Aquatic Club
- College team: University of British Columbia
Medal record
Women's swimming
Representing Canada
Summer Youth Olympics
Gold medal – first place	2010 Singapore	100m breaststroke
Silver medal – second place	2010 Singapore	200m breaststroke
Pan American Games
Silver medal – second place	2015 Toronto	4×100 m medley
Commonwealth Games
Bronze medal – third place	2014 Glasgow	4×100 m medley

Tera van Beilen (born March 30, 1993) is a Canadian competition swimmer and Olympian.

In the 2010 Summer Youth Olympics in Singapore, Van Beilen won a gold medal in the women's 100-metre breaststroke and a silver in the 200-metre breaststroke.

In 2012, while competing in the Canadian Olympic trials in Montreal, Van Beilen had qualified for the Olympics. She placed first with a time of 2:24.03, ahead of Canadian swimmer Martha McCabe with a time of 2:24.81. Van Beilen's timing placed her second in the world for 2012, behind the 2:22.73 time of reigning American Olympic champion Rebecca Soni.

During the 2012 Summer Olympics in London, Van Beilen received much attention as a Canadian Olympian. She participated in the women's 100-metre and 200-metre breaststroke categories, as well as the women's 4x100-metre medley relay. While competing in the women's 100-metre breaststroke, she proceeded to the semi-finals, only to be eliminated in a swim-off with Alia Atkinson of Jamaica.

Outside of the 2012 Olympic Games, Van Beilen competes regularly in local, provincial, and international level swimming competitions. She is currently attending the University of British Columbia studying kinesiology, and is an active member of the UBC Thunderbirds university swimming team. She has also achieved personal bests of 1:07.37 in the 100-metre breaststroke, and 2:24.03 in the 200-metre breaststroke.
