= Ekaterina Andreeva (swimmer) =

Russian swimmer

Personal information
- Born: December 13, 1993 (age 32) Vladimir, Russia

Sport
- Sport: Swimming
- Strokes: Medley

Ekaterina Andreeva (born 13 December 1993) is a Russian swimmer. She swam at the 2012 Summer Olympics in the 200 m individual medley and was eliminated after the qualifying heats. In 2013 Andreeva was suspended for 18 months after she breached anti-doping regulations.
