= Turkey at the 2010 Summer Youth Olympics =

- IOC code: TUR
- NOC: Turkish Olympic Committee
- Website: www.olimpiyatkomitesi.org.tr

in Singapore
- Competitors: 55 in 15 sports
- Flag bearer: Berkcan Süngü
- Medals Ranked 35th: Gold 1 Silver 3 Bronze 6 Total 10

Summer Youth Olympics appearances (overview)
- 2010; 2014; 2018; 2026

Turkey sent a team to compete at the 2010 Summer Youth Olympics in Singapore.

== Competitors ==
| Sport | Boys | Girls | Total |
|---|---|---|---|
| 3-on-3 basketball | 4 | 0 | 4 |
| Aquatics, Swimming | 1 | 1 | 2 |
| Archery | 1 | 1 | 2 |
| Athletics | 5 | 1 | 6 |
| Badminton | 1 | 1 | 2 |
| Boxing | 2 | 0 | 2 |
| Fencing | 1 | 0 | 1 |
| Football | 0 | 18 | 18 |
| Gymnastics, Artistic | 1 | 1 | 2 |
| Judo | 1 | 1 | 2 |
| Rowing | 2 | 1 | 3 |
| Sailing | 1 | 1 | 2 |
| Taekwondo | 1 | 1 | 2 |
| Weightlifting | 2 | 2 | 4 |
| Wrestling | 3 | 0 | 3 |
| Total | 26 | 29 | 55 |

== Medal summary ==
=== Medal table ===
| Sport | Gold | Silver | Bronze | Total |
|---|---|---|---|---|
| Wrestling | 1 | 1 | 1 | 3 |
| Boxing | 0 | 1 | 1 | 2 |
| Gymnastics | 0 | 1 | 0 | 1 |
| Fencing (mixed-NOC) | 0 | 1* | 0 | 1* |
| Taekwondo | 0 | 0 | 2 | 2 |
| Archery (mixed-NOC) | 0 | 0 | 1* | 1* |
| Football | 0 | 0 | 1 | 1 |
| Judo (mixed-NOC) | 0 | 0 | 1* | 1* |
| Weightlifting | 0 | 0 | 1 | 1 |
| Total (no mixed-NOCs medals) | 1 | 3 | 6 | 10 |

=== Medalists ===
| Medal | Name | Sport | Event |
|---|---|---|---|
| Gold | Resul Kalaycı | Wrestling | Boys freestyle 76 kg |
| Silver | Burak Akşın | Boxing | Boys 81 kg |
| Silver | Tevfik Burak Babaoğlu | Fencing | Mixed team |
| Silver | Ferhat Arıcan | Gymnastics | Boys vault |
| Silver | Musa Gedik | Wrestling | Boys grecoroman 69 kg |
| Bronze | Begünhan Ünsal | Archery | Mixed team |
| Bronze | Ümitcan Patır | Boxing | Boys 91 kg |
| Bronze | Turkey women's national football team: Hülya Cin; Nazmiye Aytop; Fatma Gülen; Fatma Barut; Eda Karataş; Dilan Akarsu; Hilal Başkol; Feride Serin; Kübra Aydın; Yaşam Göksu; Ümran Özev; Büşra Özturk; Kader Doğan; Melisa Tosun; Medine Erkan; Eda Duran; Büşra Ay; Esra Öztürk | Football | Girls |
| Bronze | Batuhan Efemgil | Judo | Mixed team |
| Bronze | Berkcan Süngü | Taekwondo | Boys 63 kg |
| Bronze | Şeyma Tuncer | Taekwondo | Girls 44 kg |
| Bronze | Emre Büyükünlü | Weightlifting | Boys 62 kg |
| Bronze | Mehmet Ali Daylak | Wrestling | Boys freestyle 54 kg |

== Results by event ==
=== 3-on-3 basketball ===
Boys

| Squad list | Preliminary | | Quarterfinal | Semifinal | Final | Rank |
| Squad list | Group B | Rank | Quarterfinal | Semifinal | Final | Rank |
|---|---|---|---|---|---|---|
| Burakcan Yıldızlı; Mertcan Özen; Kerem Hotiç; Samet Geyik; Coach: Serhat Şehit | United States; L 17–23 | 4 | 9th–16th places Virgin Islands; W 31–15 | 9th–12th places Puerto Rico; L 28–30 | 11th place match Iran; L 25–31 | 12 |
| Burakcan Yıldızlı; Mertcan Özen; Kerem Hotiç; Samet Geyik; Coach: Serhat Şehit | Singapore; W 28–24 | 4 | 9th–16th places Virgin Islands; W 31–15 | 9th–12th places Puerto Rico; L 28–30 | 11th place match Iran; L 25–31 | 12 |
| Burakcan Yıldızlı; Mertcan Özen; Kerem Hotiç; Samet Geyik; Coach: Serhat Şehit | Central African Republic; W 30–25 | 4 | 9th–16th places Virgin Islands; W 31–15 | 9th–12th places Puerto Rico; L 28–30 | 11th place match Iran; L 25–31 | 12 |
| Burakcan Yıldızlı; Mertcan Özen; Kerem Hotiç; Samet Geyik; Coach: Serhat Şehit | Israel; L 19–32 | 4 | 9th–16th places Virgin Islands; W 31–15 | 9th–12th places Puerto Rico; L 28–30 | 11th place match Iran; L 25–31 | 12 |

=== Aquatics ===
==== Swimming ====
Boys

| Athlete | Event | Heats | | Semifinals | | Final | |
| Athlete | Event | Time | Rank | Time | Rank | Time | Rank |
|---|---|---|---|---|---|---|---|
| Bertuğ Coşkun | 100 m freestyle | 52.48 | 25 | Did not advance | | | |
| Bertuğ Coşkun | 200 m freestyle | 1:53.08 | 14 | | | Did not advance | |
| Bertuğ Coşkun | 400 m freestyle | 4:05:76 | 18 | | | Did not advance | |

Girls

| Athlete | Event | Heats | | Semifinals | | Final | |
| Athlete | Event | Time | Rank | Time | Rank | Time | Rank |
|---|---|---|---|---|---|---|---|
| Gizem Bozkurt | 100 m freestyle | 59:05 | 26 | Did not advance | | | |
| Gizem Bozkurt | 200 m freestyle | 2:04.55 | 11 | | | Did not advance | |
| Gizem Bozkurt | 200 m individual medley | 2:21:40 | 8 Q | | | 2:20:00 | 8 |

=== Archery ===
Boys' recurve

| Athlete | Event | Ranking round | | 1/16 eliminations | 1/8 eliminations | Quarterfinal | Semifinal | Final | Rank |
| Athlete | Event | Score | Seed | 1/16 eliminations | 1/8 eliminations | Quarterfinal | Semifinal | Final | Rank |
|---|---|---|---|---|---|---|---|---|---|
| Yağız Yılmaz | Individual | 631 | 11 | Pianesi (ITA); W 6–5 | Rajh (SLO); L 3–7 | Did not advance | | | 9 |

Girls' recurve

| Athlete | Event | Ranking round | | 1/16 eliminations | 1/8 eliminations | Quarterfinal | Semifinal | Final | Rank |
| Athlete | Event | Score | Seed | 1/16 eliminations | 1/8 eliminations | Quarterfinal | Semifinal | Final | Rank |
|---|---|---|---|---|---|---|---|---|---|
| Begünhan Ünsal | Individual | 588 | 18 | Loh (SIN); W 6–5 | Tan (TPE); L 2–6 | Did not advance | | | 9 |

Mixed recurve

| Athlete | Event | Ranking round | | 1/16 eliminations | 1/8 eliminations | Quarterfinal | Semifinal | Final | Rank |
| Athlete | Event | Score | Seed | 1/16 eliminations | 1/8 eliminations | Quarterfinal | Semifinal | Final | Rank |
|---|---|---|---|---|---|---|---|---|---|
| Jaffar (SIN); Ünsal (TUR) | Team | 1206 | 11 | Segina (RUS); Jaworski (POL); W 6–4 | Caspersen (DEN); Rossignol (FRA); W 6–2 | Bozic (SLO); Nott (AUS); W 6–2 | Filippi (ITA); Karoukin (BLR); L 0–6 | 3rd place match Alarcón (ESP); Milon (BAN); W 6–5 | Bronze medal |
| Wojnicka (POL); Yılmaz (TUR) | Team | 1206 | 12 | Verma (IND); Linster (HUN); W 6–2 | Alarcón (ESP); Milon (BAN); L 3–7 | Did not advance | | | 9 |

=== Athletics ===
Boys

| Athlete | Event | Qualification | | Final | | Rank |
| Athlete | Event | Result | Rank | Result | Rank | Rank |
|---|---|---|---|---|---|---|
| Murat Gündüz | Discus throw | 55.26 | 7 Q | 55.09 | 8 | 8 |
| Ali Kilisli | Javelin throw | 73.64 | 4 Q | 72.30 | 5 | 5 |
| Toros Pilikoğlu | Long jump | 7.19 | 8 Q | 7.29 | 6 | 6 |
| Musa Tüzen | Triple jump | 14.42 | 12 qB | 14.30 | 4 | 12 |
| Ümit Sungur | Pole vault | 4.60 | 11 qB | No mark | | – |

Girls

| Athlete | Event | Qualification | | Final | | Rank |
| Athlete | Event | Result | Rank | Result | Rank | Rank |
|---|---|---|---|---|---|---|
| Esin Bahar Dölek | 1000 m | 2:59.03 | 13 Q | 2:57.73 | 13 | 13 |

=== Badminton ===
Boys

| Athlete | Event | Group Stage | | Quarterfinal | Semifinal | Final | Rank |
| Athlete | Event | Group G | Rank | Quarterfinal | Semifinal | Final | Rank |
|---|---|---|---|---|---|---|---|
| Emre Lale | Singles | Nguyen (VIE); W 2–0 | 2 | Did not advance | | | 9 |
| Emre Lale | Singles | Loh (MAS); L 0–2 | 2 | | | | 9 |
| Emre Lale | Singles | Ghislain (SEY); W 2–0 | 2 | | | | 9 |

Girls

| Athlete | Event | Group Stage | | Quarterfinal | Semifinal | Final | Rank |
| Athlete | Event | Group F | Rank | Quarterfinal | Semifinal | Final | Rank |
|---|---|---|---|---|---|---|---|
| Ebru Tunalı | Singles | Azeez (NGR); W 2–0 | 2 | Did not advance | | | 9 |
| Ebru Tunalı | Singles | Ugalde (MEX); W 2–0 | 2 | | | | 9 |
| Ebru Tunalı | Singles | Cheah (MAS); L 0–2 | 2 | | | | 9 |

=== Boxing ===
Boys

| Athlete | Event | Quarterfinal | Semifinal | Final | Rank |
|---|---|---|---|---|---|
| Burak Akşın | 81 kg | Bye | Ytalo Perea (ECU); W 7–0 | Irosvani Duverger (CUB); L 4–12 | Silver medal |
| Ümitcan Patır | 91 kg | Alexander Ivanov (RUS); W 4–1 | Lenier Pero (CUB); L 0–6 | 3rd place match Siyovush Zukhurov (TJK); W RSC | Bronze medal |

=== Fencing ===
Boys

| Athlete | Event | Round of pools | | Round of 16 | Quarterfinal | Semifinal | Final | Rank |
| Athlete | Event | Pools | Rank | Round of 16 | Quarterfinal | Semifinal | Final | Rank |
|---|---|---|---|---|---|---|---|---|
| Tevfik Burak Babaoğlu | Foil | Massialas (USA); L 0–5 | 2 Q | Bye | Tsoronis (DEN); W 15–9 | Luperi (ITA); L 8–15 | 3rd place match Lee (KOR); L 6–15 | 4 |
| Tevfik Burak Babaoğlu | Foil | Choi (HKG); W 5–4 | 2 Q | Bye | Tsoronis (DEN); W 15–9 | Luperi (ITA); L 8–15 | 3rd place match Lee (KOR); L 6–15 | 4 |
| Tevfik Burak Babaoğlu | Foil | Choupenitch (CZE); W 5–3 | 2 Q | Bye | Tsoronis (DEN); W 15–9 | Luperi (ITA); L 8–15 | 3rd place match Lee (KOR); L 6–15 | 4 |
| Tevfik Burak Babaoğlu | Foil | Tsoronis (DEN); W 5–1 | 2 Q | Bye | Tsoronis (DEN); W 15–9 | Luperi (ITA); L 8–15 | 3rd place match Lee (KOR); L 6–15 | 4 |
| Tevfik Burak Babaoğlu | Foil | Rosabal (CUB); W 5–3 | 2 Q | Bye | Tsoronis (DEN); W 15–9 | Luperi (ITA); L 8–15 | 3rd place match Lee (KOR); L 6–15 | 4 |
| Tevfik Burak Babaoğlu | Foil | Ong (SIN); W 5–1 | 2 Q | Bye | Tsoronis (DEN); W 15–9 | Luperi (ITA); L 8–15 | 3rd place match Lee (KOR); L 6–15 | 4 |

Mixed

| Athlete | Event | Round of 16 | Quarterfinal | Semifinal | Final | Rank |
|---|---|---|---|---|---|---|
| Europe 2 Musch (GER); Bodoczi (GER); Alekseeva (RUS); Hubers (GER); Swatowska (POL); Babaoğlu (TUR) | Team | Bye | Asia-Oceania 2 W 30–21 | Asia-Oceania 1 W 30–27 | Europe 1 L 24–30 | Silver medal |

=== Football ===
Girls

| Squad list | Preliminaries | | Semifinal | Final | Rank |
| Squad list | Group A | Rank | Semifinal | Final | Rank |
|---|---|---|---|---|---|
| Hülya Cin; Nazmiye Aytop; Fatma Gülen; Fatma Barut; Eda Karataş; Dilan Akarsu; Hilal Başkol; Feride Serin; Kübra Aydın; Yaşam Göksu; Ümran Özev; Büşra Özturk; Kader Doğan; Melisa Tosun; Medine Erkan; Eda Duran; Büşra Ay; Esra Öztürk; Coach: Hamdi Aslan | Iran; W 4–2 | 1 Q | Chile; L 2–3 | 3rd place match Iran; W 3–0 | Bronze medal |
| Hülya Cin; Nazmiye Aytop; Fatma Gülen; Fatma Barut; Eda Karataş; Dilan Akarsu; Hilal Başkol; Feride Serin; Kübra Aydın; Yaşam Göksu; Ümran Özev; Büşra Özturk; Kader Doğan; Melisa Tosun; Medine Erkan; Eda Duran; Büşra Ay; Esra Öztürk; Coach: Hamdi Aslan | Papua New Guinea; W 4–0 | 1 Q | Chile; L 2–3 | 3rd place match Iran; W 3–0 | Bronze medal |

=== Gymnastics ===
==== Artistic ====
Boys

| Athlete | Event | Qualification | | Final | | Rank |
| Athlete | Event | Score | Rank | Score | Rank | Rank |
|---|---|---|---|---|---|---|
| Ferhat Arıcan | All-around | 80.000 | 26 | Did not advance | | 26 |
| Ferhat Arıcan | Floor exercise | 12.650 | 33 | Did not advance | | 33 |
| Ferhat Arıcan | Pommel horse | 13.400 | 15 | Did not advance | | 15 |
| Ferhat Arıcan | Rings | 13.550 | 19 | Did not advance | | 19 |
| Ferhat Arıcan | Vault | 15.400 | 14 Q | 15.650 | 2 | Silver medal |
| Ferhat Arıcan | Parallel bars | 11.950 | 35 | Did not advance | | 35 |
| Ferhat Arıcan | Horizontal bar | 13.050 | 24 | Did not advance | | 24 |

Girls

| Athlete | Event | Qualification | | Final | | Rank |
| Athlete | Event | Score | Rank | Score | Rank | Rank |
|---|---|---|---|---|---|---|
| Demet Mutlu | All-around | 49.950 | 22 | Did not advance | | 22 |
| Demet Mutlu | Vault | 13.400 | 17 | Did not advance | | 17 |
| Demet Mutlu | Uneven bars | 12.000 | 22 | Did not advance | | 22 |
| Demet Mutlu | Balance beam | 12.450 | 25 | Did not advance | | 25 |
| Demet Mutlu | Floor exercise | 12.100 | 24 | Did not advance | | 24 |

=== Judo ===
Boys

| Athlete | Event | Round of 16 | Quarterfinal | Repechage | Semifinal | Final | Rank |
|---|---|---|---|---|---|---|---|
| Batuhan Efemgil | 81 kg | Dedeic (MNE); W 102–011 | Ntanatsidids (GRE); L 010–011 | Repechage; Pretivatii (MDA); W 010–001 | Repechage; Dedeic (MNE); W 020–000 | 3rd place match Toth (HUN); L 001–100 | 5 |

Girls

| Athlete | Event | Round of 16 | Quarterfinal | Repechage | Semifinal | Final | Rank |
|---|---|---|---|---|---|---|---|
| Dilara İncedayı | 63 kg | Bacaj (ALB); W 101–000 | Matic (CRO); L 000–010 | Repechage; Rak (EST); W 100–000 | Repechage; Shor (ISR); L 000–101 | Did not advance | 7 |

Mixed

| Athlete | Event | Round of 16 | Quarterfinal | Semifinal | Final | Rank |
|---|---|---|---|---|---|---|
| Tokyo; Seul (KOR); Basile (ITA); Nemorin (MRI); Martins (AND); Shor (ISR); Fernandez (HON); Darchuk (UKR); Efemgil (TUR) | Team | Paris; W 5–3 | New York; W 4–4 (3–2) | Belgrade; L 3–5 | Did not advance | Bronze medal |
| New York; Bouyssou (USA); Atanov (UKR); Bacaj (ALB); Machado (BRA); İncedayı (TUR); Pretivatii (MDA); Savic (BIH); Glusac (SRB) | Team | Bye | Tokyo; L 4–4 (2–3) | Did not advance | | 5 |

=== Rowing ===
Boys

| Athlete | Event | Heat | | | Repechage | | | Semifinal | | | Final | | Rank |
| Athlete | Event | Heat | Time | Rank | Heat | Time | Rank | Heat | Time | Rank | Time | Rank | Rank |
|---|---|---|---|---|---|---|---|---|---|---|---|---|---|
| Onat Kazaklı; Ogeday Girişken | Pairs | 1 | 3:14.17 | 4 QR | 1 | 3:25.12 | 1 QA/B | 1 | 3:18.19 | 3 QA | 3:16.64 | 6 | 6 |

Girls

| Athlete | Event | Heat | | | Repechage | | | Semifinal | | | Final | | Rank |
| Athlete | Event | Heat | Time | Rank | Heat | Time | Rank | Heat | Time | Rank | Time | Rank | Rank |
|---|---|---|---|---|---|---|---|---|---|---|---|---|---|
| Alara Dirik | Single sculls | 1 | 3:59.14 | 3 QR | 3 | 4:03.78 | 1 QA/B | 2 | 4:03.41 | 3 QB | 4:03.03 | 5 | 11 |

=== Sailing ===
Boys

| Athlete | Event | Race | | | | | | | | | | | | Total | Rank |
| Athlete | Event | 1 | 2 | 3 | 4 | 5 | 6 | 7 | 8 | 9 | 10 | 11 | M | Total | Rank |
|---|---|---|---|---|---|---|---|---|---|---|---|---|---|---|---|
| Alp Rodopman | Byte CII | 15 | 19 | 9 | ~~25~~ | 22 | 15 | 25 | 13 | 23 | ~~28~~ | 25 | 21 | 187 | 23 |

Girls

| Athlete | Event | Race | | | | | | | | | | | | Total | Rank |
| Athlete | Event | 1 | 2 | 3 | 4 | 5 | 6 | 7 | 8 | 9 | 10 | 11 | M | Total | Rank |
|---|---|---|---|---|---|---|---|---|---|---|---|---|---|---|---|
| Pınar Kaynar | Byte CII | 8 | 13 | ~~14~~ | 5 | 12 | 13 | ~~22~~ | 14 | 14 | 14 | 14 | 15 | 122 | 15 |

=== Taekwondo ===
Boys

| Athlete | Event | Preliminary | Quarterfinal | Semifinal | Final | Rank |
|---|---|---|---|---|---|---|
| Berkcan Süngü | 63 kg | Bye | Anikiej (POL); W 10–7 | Silva (POR); L 3–5 | Did not advance | Bronze medal |

Girls

| Athlete | Event | Preliminary | Quarterfinal | Semifinal | Final | Rank |
|---|---|---|---|---|---|---|
| Şeyma Tuncer | 44 kg | Shirjahani (IRI); W 11–0 | Mustapha (FRA); W 4–2 | Valueva (RUS); L 4–8 | Did not advance | Bronze medal |

=== Weightlifting ===
Boys

| Athlete | Event | Snatch | Clean & Jerk | Total | Rank |
|---|---|---|---|---|---|
| Emre Büyükünlü | 62 kg | 111 | 135 | 246 | Bronze medal |
| Melih Akın | +85 kg | 132 | 177 | 309 | 4 |

Girls

| Athlete | Event | Snatch | Clean & Jerk | Total | Rank |
|---|---|---|---|---|---|
| Damla Aydın | 53 kg | 67 | 80 | 147 | 6 |
| Neslihan Okumuş | 63 kg | 87 | 106 | 193 | 4 |

=== Wrestling ===
Boys, freestyle

| Athlete | Event | Pools | | Final | Rank |
| Athlete | Event | Groups | Rank | Final | Rank |
|---|---|---|---|---|---|
| Mehmet Ali Daylak | 54 kg | Serrata (DOM); W 2–0 | Group B 2 q | 3rd place match Hernandez (COL); W 2–0 | Bronze medal |
| Mehmet Ali Daylak | 54 kg | Ghanmi (TUN); W 2–0 | Group B 2 q | 3rd place match Hernandez (COL); W 2–0 | Bronze medal |
| Mehmet Ali Daylak | 54 kg | Mbambi (CGO); W TF | Group B 2 q | 3rd place match Hernandez (COL); W 2–0 | Bronze medal |
| Mehmet Ali Daylak | 54 kg | Takahashi (JPN); L 0–2 | Group B 2 q | 3rd place match Hernandez (COL); W 2–0 | Bronze medal |
| Resul Kalaycı | 76 kg | Ergashev (UZB); W 2–0 | Group B 1 q | Rogers (USA); W Pin | Gold medal |
| Resul Kalaycı | 76 kg | Webb (CAN); W 2–0 | Group B 1 q | Rogers (USA); W Pin | Gold medal |
| Resul Kalaycı | 76 kg | Hushtyn (BLR); W TF | Group B 1 q | Rogers (USA); W Pin | Gold medal |

Boys, Grecoroman

| Athlete | Event | Pools | | Final | Rank |
| Athlete | Event | Groups | Rank | Final | Rank |
|---|---|---|---|---|---|
| Musa Gedik | 69 kg | Darwish (SYR); W 2–1 | Group A 1 q | Kandybayev (KAZ); L 0–2 | Silver medal |
| Musa Gedik | 69 kg | Ghaderian (IRI); W Pin | Group A 1 q | Kandybayev (KAZ); L 0–2 | Silver medal |
| Musa Gedik | 69 kg | Ouakali (ALG); W 2–1 | Group A 1 q | Kandybayev (KAZ); L 0–2 | Silver medal |
