= Dominican Republic at the 2010 Summer Youth Olympics =

- IOC code: DOM
- NOC: Comité Olímpico Dominicano

in Singapore
- Competitors: 7 in 4 sports
- Flag bearer: Luguelín Santos
- Medals Ranked 48th: Gold 1 Silver 0 Bronze 1 Total 2

Summer Youth Olympics appearances
- 2010; 2014; 2018; 2026

Dominican Republic participated in the 2010 Summer Youth Olympics in Singapore.

== Medalists ==
Medal	Name	Sport	Event	Date
Gold	Luguelin Santos	Athletics	Boys' 400m	21 Aug
Gold	Luguelin Santos	Athletics	Boys' medley relay(in Mixed-NOC Team)	23 Aug
Bronze	Fany Chalas	Athletics	Girls' 100m	21 Aug

== Athletics ==
=== Boys ===
Track and Road Events

Athletes	Event	Qualification		Final	
Athletes	Event	Result	Rank	Result	Rank
Luguelín Santos	Boys’ 400m	46.82	1 Q	47.11	Gold medal
Caio Dos Santos (BRA); Odean Skeen (JAM); Najee Glass (USA); Luguelín Santos (DOM)	Boys’ Medley Relay			1:51.38	Gold medal

=== Girls ===
Track and Road Events

Athletes	Event	Qualification		Final	
Athletes	Event	Result	Rank	Result	Rank
Fany Chalas	Girls’ 100m	11.70	1 Q	11.65	Bronze medal
María Mancebo	Girls’ 1000m	2:51.85	8 Q	2:55.16	11

== Sailing ==
One Person Dinghy

Athlete	Event	Race												Points	Rank
Athlete	Event	1	2	3	4	5	6	7	8	9	10	11	M*	Points	Rank
Eduardo Ariza	Boys' Byte CII	11	~~25~~	20	~~21~~	21	11	9	14	6	15	14	5	126	16
Paloma Esteban	Girls' Byte CII	~~26~~	17	20	11	18	~~22~~	13	22	13	3	5	28	150	20

== Weightlifting ==
Athlete	Event	Snatch	Clean & Jerk	Total	Rank
Yineisy Reyes	Girls' 53kg	80	86	166	4

== Wrestling ==
Freestyle

Athlete	Event	Pools		Final	Rank
Athlete	Event	Groups	Rank	Final	Rank
Jeffry Serrata	Boys' 54kg	Ghanmi (TUN); W 2–0 (2–0, 8–5)	3	5th place match Lawrence (AUS); L 1–2 (0–6, 8–0, 3-6)	6
Jeffry Serrata	Boys' 54kg	Daylak (TUR); L 0–2 (0–1, 2–5)	3	5th place match Lawrence (AUS); L 1–2 (0–6, 8–0, 3-6)	6
Jeffry Serrata	Boys' 54kg	Takahashi (JPN); L Fall (0–6)	3	5th place match Lawrence (AUS); L 1–2 (0–6, 8–0, 3-6)	6
Jeffry Serrata	Boys' 54kg	Mbambi (CGO); W 2–0 (3–0, 1–0)	3	5th place match Lawrence (AUS); L 1–2 (0–6, 8–0, 3-6)	6
