= Republic of the Congo at the 2010 Summer Youth Olympics =

- Flag of the Republic of the Congo
- IOC code: CGO
- NOC: Comité National Olympique et Sportif Congolais

in Singapore
- Competitors: 4 in 4 sports
- Flag bearer: Thierry Mabounda

Summer Youth Olympics appearances
- 2010; 2014; 2018

Congo participated in the 2010 Summer Youth Olympics in Singapore.

The Congo team consisted of 4 athletes competing in 4 sports: athletics, table tennis, taekwondo and wrestling.

== Athletics ==
=== Girls ===
Track and Road Events

Athletes	Event	Qualification		Final	
Athletes	Event	Result	Rank	Result	Rank
Merveille Mezame-Egeindita	Girls’ 100m	13.11	22 qC	13.10	20

== Table tennis ==
Individual

Athlete	Event	Round 1		Round 2		Quarterfinals	Semifinals	Final	Rank
Athlete	Event	Group Matches	Rank	Group Matches	Rank	Quarterfinals	Semifinals	Final	Rank
Jolie Mafuta Ivoso	Girls' Singles	Bliznet (MDA); L 0-3 (3-11, 6-11, 3-11)	4 qB	Bhandarkar (IND); L 0-3 (4-11, 6-11, 2-11)	3	Did not advance			25
Jolie Mafuta Ivoso	Girls' Singles	Pang (FRA); L 0-3 (3-11, 9-11, 2-11)	4 qB	BYE	3	Did not advance			25
Jolie Mafuta Ivoso	Girls' Singles	Yang (KOR); L 0-3 (2-11, 4-11, 4-11)	4 qB	Nagyvaradi (HUN); L 0-3 (3-11, 2-11, 5-11)	3	Did not advance			25

Team

Athlete	Event	Round 1		Round 2	Quarterfinals	Semifinals	Final	Rank
Athlete	Event	Group Matches	Rank	Round 2	Quarterfinals	Semifinals	Final	Rank
Africa 2 Jolie Mafuta Ivoso (CGO); Wa Warren Li Kam (MRI)	Mixed Team	Europe 3 Loveridge (GBR); Mutti (ITA); L 0-3 (0-3, 0-3, 1-3)	4 qB	Intercontinental 2 Noskova (RUS); Holikov (UZB); L 0-2 (0-3, 0-3)	Did not advance			25
Africa 2 Jolie Mafuta Ivoso (CGO); Wa Warren Li Kam (MRI)	Mixed Team	Europe 4 Bliznet (MDA); Kulpa (POL); L 0-3 (0-3, 0-3, 0-3)	4 qB	Intercontinental 2 Noskova (RUS); Holikov (UZB); L 0-2 (0-3, 0-3)	Did not advance			25
Africa 2 Jolie Mafuta Ivoso (CGO); Wa Warren Li Kam (MRI)	Mixed Team	Europe 1 Szocs (ROU); Soderlund (SWE); L 0-3 (0-3, 1-3, 0-3)	4 qB	Intercontinental 2 Noskova (RUS); Holikov (UZB); L 0-2 (0-3, 0-3)	Did not advance			25

== Taekwondo ==
Athlete	Event	Preliminary	Quarterfinal	Semifinal	Final	Rank
Thierry Mabounda	Boys' -55kg	Naing Dwe Shein Shein (MYA); L 4-5	Did not advance			9

== Wrestling ==
Freestyle

Athlete	Event	Pools		Final	Rank
Athlete	Event	Groups	Rank	Final	Rank
Prince Mbambi	Boys' 54kg	Ghanmi (TUN); L 0–2 (2–5, 1–4)	5	9th place match BYE	9
Prince Mbambi	Boys' 54kg	Takahashi (JPN); L T. Fall (0–7, 0–7)	5	9th place match BYE	9
Prince Mbambi	Boys' 54kg	Daylak (TUR); L T. Fall (0–8, 0–6)	5	9th place match BYE	9
Prince Mbambi	Boys' 54kg	Serrata (DOM); L 0–2 (0–3, 0–1)	5	9th place match BYE	9
