= Azerbaijan at the 2010 Summer Youth Olympics =

- Flag of Azerbaijan
- IOC code: AZE
- NOC: Azerbaijan Olympic Committee
- Website: www.noc-aze.org

in Singapore
- Competitors: 12 in 6 sports
- Flag bearer: Shaban Shahpalangov
- Medals Ranked 11th: Gold 5 Silver 3 Bronze 0 Total 8

Summer Youth Olympics appearances (overview)
- 2010; 2014; 2018

Azerbaijan participated in the 2010 Summer Youth Olympics in Singapore with 12 athletes.

== Medalists ==
Medal	Name	Sport	Event	Date
Gold	Murad Bazarov	Wrestling	Men's Greco-Roman 42 kg	15 Aug
Gold	Elman Mukhtarov	Wrestling	Men's Greco-Roman 50 kg	15 Aug
Gold	Patimat Bagomedova	Wrestling	Women's Freestyle 52 kg	16 Aug
Gold	Nijat Rahimov	Weightlifting	Men's 69 kg	17 Aug
Gold	Ali Magomedabirov	Wrestling	Men's Freestyle 100 kg	17 Aug
Silver	Kanan Guliyev	Wrestling	Men's Freestyle 54 kg	17 Aug
Silver	Salman Alizade	Boxing	Men's Light Fly 48 kg	25 Aug
Silver	Elvin Isayev	Boxing	Men's Feather 57 kg	25 Aug

== Boxing ==
Boys

Athlete	Event	Preliminaries	Semifinals	Final
Salman Alizadeh	Light Flyweight (48kg)		Hamid (SIN); W RSC R2 2:49	Burnett (IRL); L 6-13
Shaban Shahpalangov	Flyweight (51kg)	Abdelaal (EGY); L 4-8	Did not advance	5th place Bout; Vetkin (RUS); L RSC R2 2:48
Elvin Isayev	Featherweight (57kg)	Dashdorj (MGL); W 13-2	Macayo (VEN); W 10-6	Bril (GER); L 4-11

== Canoeing ==
Boys

Athlete	Event	Time Trial		Round 1	Round 2 (Rep)	Round 3	Round 4	Round 5	Final
Athlete	Event	Time	Rank	Round 1	Round 2 (Rep)	Round 3	Round 4	Round 5	Final
Radoslav Kutsev	Boys’ C1 Slalom	1:57.56	7	Babayan (ARM); W 1:54.31-2:06.43		Sokol (POL); W 1:53.53-1:56.59	Melnyk (UKR); L 1:59.31-1:48.36	Did not advance	
Radoslav Kutsev	Boys’ C1 Sprint	1:49.89	9	Tiganu (MDA); W 1:48.33-1:51.08		Castaneda (MEX); L 1:54.97-1:49.45	Cardenas (CUB); L 1:52.31-1:47.23	Did not advance	

== Judo ==
Boys

Athlete	Event	Round 1	Round 2	Repechage Round 1	Repechage Round 2	Round 3	Repechage Round 3	Repechage Round 4	Repechage Final	Final
Athlete	Event	Opposition Result	Opposition Result	Opposition Result	Opposition Result	Opposition Result	Opposition Result	Opposition Result	Opposition Result	Opposition Result
Jalil Jalilov	Boys' −66 kg		Ferreira Martins (AND); W 100-000			Schneider (USA); L 000-111		Cai (DEN); L 000-010	Did not advance	

Team

Team	Event	Round 1	Round 2	Semifinals	Final	Rank
Team	Event	Opposition Result	Opposition Result	Opposition Result	Opposition Result	Rank
Munich; Vita Valnova (BLR); Kęstutis Vitkauskas (LTU); Un Ju Ri (PRK); Beka Tugushi (GEO); Jalil Jalilov (AZE); Caren Chammas (LIB); Yacov Mamistvalov (ISR)	Mixed Team	Essen; L 3-4	Did not advance			9

== Taekwondo ==
Boys

Athlete	Event	Preliminary	Quarterfinals	Semifinals	Final
Athlete	Event	Opposition Result	Opposition Result	Opposition Result	Opposition Result
Sabuhi Ismayilzadeh	-73 kg	van Dijk (SUR); L 6-7	Did not advance		

== Weightlifting ==
Boys

Athlete	Event	Snatch (kg)				Clean & jerk (kg)				Total (kg)
Athlete	Event	1	2	3	Res	1	2	3	Res	Total (kg)
Nijat Rahimov	-69 kg	125	130	134	134	154	161	~~166~~	161	295

== Wrestling ==
Freestyle

Boys

Athlete	Event	Group stage				Repechage Round	Final
Athlete	Event	Qualification	Round 1	Round 2	Round 3	Repechage Round	Final
Athlete	Event	Opposition Result	Opposition Result	Opposition Result	Opposition Result	Opposition Result	Opposition Result
Kanan Guliyev	−54 kg		Hernandez (COL); W 2-0 (5-0, 2-1)	Leung (SIN); W T. Fall (6-0, 7-0)	Lawrence (AUS); W Fall (7-1)		Takahashi (JPN); L 0-2 (0-4, 0-4)
Ali Magomedabirov	−100 kg		Enkhtugs (MGL); W 2-0 (1-0, 2-1)	Petriashvili (GEO); W 2-0 (2-0, 3-0)	Sualevai (ASA); W Fall (2-0)		Conyedo Ruano (CUB); W 3-0

Girls

Athlete	Event	Group stage				Repechage Round	Final
Athlete	Event	Qualification	Round 1	Round 2	Round 3	Repechage Round	Final
Athlete	Event	Opposition Result	Opposition Result	Opposition Result	Opposition Result	Opposition Result	Opposition Result
Patimat Bagomedova	−52 kg		Azzouz (ALG); W T. Fall (7-0, 6-0)	Gadaeva (UZB); W Fall (3-0)	Eustaquio (GUM); W T. Fall (6-0, 7-0)		Yuan (CHN); W 2-0 (4-2, 1+-1)

Greco-Roman

Athlete	Event	Group stage			Repechage Round	Final
Athlete	Event	Round 1	Round 2	Round 3	Repechage Round	Final
Athlete	Event	Opposition Result	Opposition Result	Opposition Result	Opposition Result	Opposition Result
Murad Bazarov	−42 kg	Zhabskyy (UKR); W 2-0 (7-0, 4-0)	Pilay (ECU); W 2-0 (1-0, 3-0)			Peña Flores (CUB); W 2-0 (2-0, 1-0)
Elman Mukhtarov	−50 kg	Pikuza (BLR); W 2-0 (3-0, 3-0)	Rodriguez Banguela (CUB); W 2-0 (2-0, 5-1)			Hakkulov (UZB); W 2-0 (3-0, 4-0)
