= Georgia at the 2010 Summer Youth Olympics =

- Flag of Georgia
- IOC code: GEO
- NOC: Georgian National Olympic Committee
- Website: www.geonoc.org.ge

in Singapore
- Competitors: 5 in 3 sports
- Flag bearer: Giorgi Mtvralashvili
- Medals Ranked 84th: Gold 0 Silver 0 Bronze 1 Total 1

Summer Youth Olympics appearances
- 2010; 2014; 2018

Georgia participated in the 2010 Summer Youth Olympics in Singapore.

== Medalists ==
Medal	Name	Sport	Event	Date
Bronze	Irakli Mosidze	Wrestling	Men's Freestyle 63kg	17 Aug

== Judo ==
Individual

Athlete	Event	Round 1	Round 2	Round 3	Round 4	Semifinals	Final	Rank
Athlete	Event	Opposition Result	Opposition Result	Opposition Result	Opposition Result	Opposition Result	Opposition Result	Rank
Beka Tugushi	Boys' -66 kg	Agibayev (KAZ); L 000-100	Repechage; Machado (BRA); W 100-000	Repechage; Marxer (LIE); W 111-000	Repechage; Agibayev (KAZ); W 010-000	Repechage; Visan (ROU); W 100-000	Bronze-medal match Ghasaryan (ARM); L 001-002	5
Sophio Beridze	Girls' -63 kg	BYE	Arrey (CMR); W 100-000	Gomes (BRA); L 000-112	Repechage; Chammas (LIB); L 000-100	Did not advance		9

Team

Team	Event	Round 1	Round 2	Semifinals	Final	Rank
Team	Event	Opposition Result	Opposition Result	Opposition Result	Opposition Result	Rank
Munich; Vita Valnova (BLR); Kęstutis Vitkauskas (LTU); Un Ju Ri (PRK); Beka Tugushi (GEO); Jalil Jalilov (AZE); Caren Chammas (LIB); Yakov Mamustavalov (ISR)	Mixed Team	Essen; L 3-4	Did not advance			9
Chiba; Dieulourdes Joseph (HAI); Diau Bauro (FIJ); Alexandra Pop (ROU); Phuc Cai (DEN); Sophio Beridze (GEO); Rijad Dedeic (MNE); Ryosuke Igarashi (JPN)	Mixed Team	BYE	Essen; L 2-5	Did not advance		5

== Swimming ==
Athletes	Event	Heat		Semifinal		Final	
Athletes	Event	Time	Position	Time	Position	Time	Position
Giorgi Mtvralashvili	Boys’ 200m Individual Medley	2:12.70	24			Did not advance	

== Wrestling ==
Freestyle

Athlete	Event	Pools		Final	Rank
Athlete	Event	Groups	Rank	Final	Rank
Irakli Mosidze	Boys' 63kg	Pshnatlov (RUS); L T. Fall (0–7, 0–6)	2	3rd place match Murphy (USA); W 2–0 (7–4, 6–0)	Bronze medal
Irakli Mosidze	Boys' 63kg	Fazlic (AUS); W T. Fall (7–0, 9–0)	2	3rd place match Murphy (USA); W 2–0 (7–4, 6–0)	Bronze medal
Irakli Mosidze	Boys' 63kg	Pilay (ECU); W 2–0 (3–2, 7–0)	2	3rd place match Murphy (USA); W 2–0 (7–4, 6–0)	Bronze medal
Geno Petriashvili	Boys' 100kg	Magomedabirov (AZE); L 0–2 (0–2, 0–3)	2	3rd place match Kadian (IND); L 0–2 (1–2, 0–1)	4
Geno Petriashvili	Boys' 100kg	Sualevai (ASA); W T. Fall (6–0, 5–0)	2	3rd place match Kadian (IND); L 0–2 (1–2, 0–1)	4
Geno Petriashvili	Boys' 100kg	Enkhtugs (MGL); W 2–0 (3–1, 1–0)	2	3rd place match Kadian (IND); L 0–2 (1–2, 0–1)	4
