= Wrestling at the 2010 Summer Youth Olympics – Boys' freestyle 54 kg =

The boys' 54 kg tournament in wrestling at the 2010 Summer Youth Olympics was held on August 17 at the International Convention Centre.

The event limited competitors to a maximum of 54 kilograms of body mass. The tournament had two groups where wrestlers compete in a round-robin format. The winners of each group would go on to play for the gold medal, second placers played for the bronze medal while everyone else played for classification depending on where they ranked in the group stage.

== Medalists ==
Gold	Silver	Bronze
Yuki Takahashi; Japan	Kanan Guluyev; Azerbaijan	Mehmet Ali Daylak; Turkey

== Group stages ==
=== Group A ===
Athlete	Pld	C. Points	T. Points
Kanan Guluyev (AZE)	3	11	27
Yerzon Hernandez (COL)	3	8	20
Jayden Lawrence (AUS)	3	5	14
Kester Chun Yue Leung (SIN)	3	0	0

Yerzon Hernandez (COL)	0-2 (0-5, 1-2)	Kanan Guluyev (AZE)
Jayden Lawrence (AUS)	T. Fall (6–0, 6–0)	Kester Chun Yue Leung (SIN)
Yerzon Hernandez (COL)	2-0 (3–0, 3–1)	Jayden Lawrence (AUS)
Kanan Guluyev (AZE)	T. Fall (6–0, 7–0)	Kester Chun Yue Leung (SIN)
Yerzon Hernandez (COL)	T. Fall (6–0, 7–0)	Kester Chun Yue Leung (SIN)
Kanan Guluyev (AZE)	Fall (7–1)	Jayden Lawrence (AUS)

=== Group B ===
Athlete	Pld	C. Points	T. Points
Yuki Takahashi (JPN)	4	15	39
Mehmet Ali Daylak (TUR)	4	10	28
Jeffry Serrata (DOM)	4	7	16
Maher Ghanmi (TUN)	4	4	14
Prince Mbambi (CGO)	4	1	3

Maher Ghanmi (TUN)	T. Fall (0-6, 0-7)	Yuki Takahashi (JPN)
Jeffry Serrata (DOM)	0-2 (0-1, 2-5)	Mehmet Ali Daylak (TUR)
Maher Ghanmi (TUN)	2-0 (5–2, 4–1)	Prince Mbambi (CGO)
Yuki Takahashi (JPN)	Fall (6–0)	Jeffry Serrata (DOM)
Maher Ghanmi (TUN)	0-2 (0-1, 0-7)	Mehmet Ali Daylak (TUR)
Yuki Takahashi (JPN)	T. Fall (7–0, 7–0)	Prince Mbambi (CGO)
Maher Ghanmi (TUN)	0-2 (0-2, 5-8)	Jeffry Serrata (DOM)
Mehmet Ali Daylak (TUR)	T. Fall (8–0, 6–0)	Prince Mbambi (CGO)
Yuki Takahashi (JPN)	2-0 (3–0, 3–0)	Mehmet Ali Daylak (TUR)
Jeffry Serrata (DOM)	2-0 (3–0, 1–0)	Prince Mbambi (CGO)

== Classification ==
=== 7th-place match ===
Kester Chun Yue Leung (SIN)	T. Fall (0-7, 0-6)	Maher Ghanmi (TUN)

=== 5th-place match ===
Jayden Lawrence (AUS)	2-1 (6–0, 0-8, 6–3)	Jeffry Serrata (DOM)

=== Bronze-medal match ===
Yerzon Hernandez (COL)	0-2 (2-6, 1-3)	Mehmet Ali Daylak (TUR)

=== Gold-medal match ===
Kanan Guluyev (AZE)	0-2 (0-4, 0-4)	Yuki Takahashi (JPN)

== Final rankings ==
Rank	Athlete
Gold medal	Yuki Takahashi (JPN)
Silver medal	Kanan Guluyev (AZE)
Bronze medal	Mehmet Ali Daylak (TUR)
4	Yerzon Hernandez (COL)
5	Jayden Lawrence (AUS)
6	Jeffry Serrata (DOM)
7	Maher Ghanmi (TUN)
8	Kester Chun Yue Leung (SIN)
9	Prince Mbambi (CGO)
