= Japan at the 2010 Summer Youth Olympics =

- IOC code: JPN
- NOC: Japanese Olympic Committee
- Website: www.joc.or.jp

in Singapore
- Competitors: 71 in 16 sports
- Flag bearer: Ayuka Tanioka
- Medals Ranked 7th: Gold 8 Silver 5 Bronze 3 Total 16

Summer Youth Olympics appearances (overview)
- 2010; 2014; 2018; 2026

Japan competed at the 2010 Summer Youth Olympics, the inaugural Youth Olympic Games, held in Singapore from 14 August to 26 August 2010.

== Medalists ==
Medal	Name	Sport	Event	Date
Gold	Yuka Sato	Triathlon	Girls' triathlon	15 August
Gold	Yu Miyahara	Wrestling	Girls' freestyle 46 kg	16 August
Gold	Yuki Takahashi	Wrestling	Boys' freestyle 54 kg	17 August
Gold	Yuya Kamoto	Gymnastics	Boys' individual all-around	18 August
Gold	Miku Tashiro	Judo	Girls' 63 kg	22 August
Gold	Koki Niwa	Table tennis	Boys' singles	23 August
Gold	Ryosuke Igarashi	Judo	Boys' 100 kg	23 August
Gold	Koki Niwa; Ayuka Tanioka	Table tennis	Mixed team	26 August
Silver	Masaki Nashimoto	Athletics	Boys' 100 m	21 August
Silver	Yuya Kamoto	Gymnastics	Boys' rings	21 August
Silver	Keisuke Homma	Athletics	Boys' 200 m	22 August
Silver	Moe Kyuma	Athletics	Girls' 3000 m	22 August
Silver	Sho Matsubara	Athletics	Boys' long jump	22 August
Bronze	Ginga Munetomo	Gymnastics	Boys' trampoline	20 August
Bronze	Chisato Doihata	Gymnastics	Girls' trampoline	20 August
Bronze	Maya Hamano	Swimming	Girls' 200 m breaststroke	20 August

Medals by sport
Sport	1st place, gold medalist(s)	2nd place, silver medalist(s)	3rd place, bronze medalist(s)	Total
Judo	2	0	0	2
Table tennis	2	0	0	2
Wrestling	2	0	0	2
Gymnastics	1	1	2	4
Triathlon	1	0	0	1
Athletics	0	4	0	4
Swimming	0	0	1	1
Total	8	5	3	16

Medals by day
Day	1st place, gold medalist(s)	2nd place, silver medalist(s)	3rd place, bronze medalist(s)	Total
August 15	1	0	0	1
August 16	1	0	0	1
August 17	1	0	0	1
August 18	1	0	0	1
August 19	0	0	0	0
August 20	0	0	3	3
August 21	0	2	0	2
August 22	1	3	0	4
August 23	2	0	0	2
August 24	0	0	0	0
August 25	0	0	0	0
August 26	1	0	0	1
Total	8	5	3	16

== Archery ==
Boys

Athlete	Event	Ranking Round		Round of 32	Round of 16	Quarterfinals	Semifinals	Final	
Athlete	Event	Score	Seed	Opposition Score	Opposition Score	Opposition Score	Opposition Score	Opposition Score	Rank
Tsukushi Koiwa	Boys' individual	635	8	Chu (USA); W 6–4	Nott (AUS); L 4–6	Did not advance			9

Girls

Athlete	Event	Ranking Round		Round of 32	Round of 16	Quarterfinals	Semifinals	Final	
Athlete	Event	Score	Seed	Opposition Score	Opposition Score	Opposition Score	Opposition Score	Opposition Score	Rank
Mai Okubo	Girls' individual	583	19	Safitri (INA); W 6–4	Segina (RUS); L 4–6	Did not advance			9

Mixed Team

Athlete	Event	Partner	Round of 32	Round of 16	Quarterfinals	Semifinals	Final	
Athlete	Event	Partner	Opposition Score	Opposition Score	Opposition Score	Opposition Score	Opposition Score	Rank
Tsukushi Koiwa	Mixed Team	Alice Ingley (AUS)	Viehmeir (GER)/ Park (CAN); W 7–3	Kamel (EGY)/ Oever (NED); W 7–3	Alarcón (ESP)/ Milon (BAN); L 5–6	Did not advance		5
Mai Okubo	Mixed Team	Yuan-Hsiang Ku (TPE)	Avitia (MEX)/ Hautamaki (FIN); W 6–0	Song (CHN)/ Pianesi (ITA); L 0–6	Did not advance			9

== Athletics ==
=== Boys ===
Track and road events

Athletes	Event	Qualification		Final	
Athletes	Event	Result	Rank	Result	Rank
Masaki Nashimoto	Boys' 100m	10.74	4 Q	10.51	Silver medal
Keisuke Homma	Boys' 200m	21.74	4 Q	21.27	Silver medal
Koki Takada	Boys' 1000m	DSQ qB		2:29.29	15
Kazuto Nishiike	Boys' 3000m	8:13.05	4 Q	8:08.57	4
Genki Naruse	Boys' 400m hurdles	54.71	14 qC	52.86	12
Masaki Nashimoto (JPN); Xie Zhenye (CHN); Abdullah Ahmed Abkar (KSA); Dongbaek Choi (KOR)	Boys' medley relay			1:54.14	5

Field Events

Athletes	Event	Qualification		Final	
Athletes	Event	Result	Rank	Result	Rank
Daichi Nakamura	Boys' Discus Throw	52.84	11 qB	51.82	12
Sho Matsubara	Boys' Long Jump	7.51	4 Q	7.65	Silver medal
Wataru Tanaka	Boys' Pole Vault	4.80	1 Q	4.70	7

=== Girls ===
Track and road events

Athletes	Event	Qualification		Final	
Athletes	Event	Result	Rank	Result	Rank
Mai Nishiwaki	Girls' 1000m	2:52.85	10 Q	2:54.39	9
Moe Kyuma	Girls' 3000m	9:35.33	2 Q	9:23.70	Silver medal
Motoko Nakahara	Girls' 100m hurdles	14.32	13 qB	14.29	13

Field events

Athletes	Event	Qualification		Final	
Athletes	Event	Result	Rank	Result	Rank
Shoko Matsuda	Girls' shot put	13.08	12 qB	13.53	10
Tsukasa Okumura	Girls' javelin throw	42.62	10 qB	46.24	9
Yuka Takahashi	Girls' long jump	5.99	5 Q	6.08	5
Remi Odajima	Girls' pole vault	3.80	8 Q	3.65	6

== Badminton ==
Boys

Athlete	Event	Group stage				Knock-out stage			
Athlete	Event	Match 1	Match 2	Match 3	Rank	Quarterfinal	Semifinal	Final	Rank
Kento Horiuchi	Boys' singles	Sukamta (INA) L 1–2 (7–21, 21–14, 13–21)	Pan (CAN) W 2–0 (21–18, 21–10)	Djabar (SUR) W 2–0 (21–11, 21–15)	2	Did not advance			

Girls

Athlete	Event	Group Stage				Knock-Out Stage			
Athlete	Event	Match 1	Match 2	Match 3	Rank	Quarterfinal	Semifinal	Final	Rank
Misaki Matsutomo	Girls' singles	Wentholt (NED) L 1–2 (17–21, 21–5, 19–21)	Kune (MRI) W 2–0 (21–4, 21–2)	Wong (CAN) W 2–0 (21–11, 21–9)	2	Did not advance			
Naoko Fukuman	Girls' singles	Zharka (UKR) W 2–0 (21–8, 21–8)	Choi (KOR) L 0–2 (15–21, 14–21)	Vu (VIE) L 1–2 (15–21, 21–16, 10–21)	3	Did not advance			

== Basketball ==
Girls

Squad list	Event	Group stage		Placement stage			Rank
Squad list	Event	Group D	Rank	1st–8th	5th–8th	5th–6th	Rank
Misato Kuma; Hikari Itaya; Maria Imanaka; Moeko Nagaoka (C)	Girls' basketball	Italy; L 17–26	2	China; L 23–26	Germany; W 28–18	Brazil; W 32–29	5
Misato Kuma; Hikari Itaya; Maria Imanaka; Moeko Nagaoka (C)	Girls' basketball	Australia; W 17–10	2	China; L 23–26	Germany; W 28–18	Brazil; W 32–29	5
Misato Kuma; Hikari Itaya; Maria Imanaka; Moeko Nagaoka (C)	Girls' basketball	Chile; W 24–17	2	China; L 23–26	Germany; W 28–18	Brazil; W 32–29	5
Misato Kuma; Hikari Itaya; Maria Imanaka; Moeko Nagaoka (C)	Girls' basketball	France; W 34–20	2	China; L 23–26	Germany; W 28–18	Brazil; W 32–29	5

== Cycling ==
Cross country

Athlete	Event	Time	Rank	Points
Idomu Yamamoto	Boys' cross country	1:05:14	19	72
Manami Iwade	Girls' cross country	54:19	11	32

Time trial

Athlete	Event	Time	Rank	Points
Koji Nagase	Boys' time trial	4:14.07	15	28
Manami Iwade	Girls' time trial	3:42.29	20	40

BMX

Athlete	Event	Seeding round		Quarterfinals							Semifinals							Final		
Athlete	Event	Seeding round		Run 1		Run 2		Run 3		Rank	Run 1		Run 2		Run 3		Rank	Final		
Athlete	Event	Time	Rank	Time	Rank	Time	Rank	Time	Rank	Rank	Time	Rank	Time	Rank	Time	Rank	Rank	Time	Rank	Points
Yoshitaku Nagasako	Boys' BMX	32.353	7	36.726	2	33.045	2	32.581	2	2 Q	32.907	5	32.839	2	55.485	6	4 Q	31.938	5	30
Manami Iwade	Girls' BMX	43.321	10	43.573	3	42.648	3	42.540	3	3 Q	44.103	6	43.318	5	43.916	6	5	Did not advance		30

Road race

Athlete	Event	Time	Rank	Points
Koji Nagase	Boys' Road race	1:05:44	21	72
Idomu Yamamoto	Boys' Road race	1:05:44	26	
Yoshitaku Nagasako	Boys' Road race	DNF		

Overall

Team	Event	Cross Country Pts		Time Trial Pts		BMX Pts		Road race Pts	Total	Rank
Team	Event	Boys	Girls	Boys	Girls	Boys	Girls	Road race Pts	Total	Rank
Manami Iwade; Idomu Yamamoto; Koji Nagase; Yoshitaku Nagasako	Mixed Team	72	32	28	40	30	30	72	304	16

== Gymnastics ==
=== Artistic gymnastics ===
Boys

Athlete	Event	Floor		Pommel horse		Rings		Vault		Parallel bars		Horizontal bar		Total	
Athlete	Event	Score	Rank	Score	Rank	Score	Rank	Score	Rank	Score	Rank	Score	Rank	Score	Rank
Yuya Kamoto	Boys' qualification	14.500	2 Q	13.650	5 Q	14.500	2 Q	15.750	5	14.850	1 Q	13.950	5 Q	87.200	1 Q
Yuya Kamoto	Boys' individual all-around	14.250	2	13.350	6	14.400	2	15.700	3	14.600	1	14.050	2	86.350	Gold medal

Athlete	Event	Score	Rank
Yuya Kamoto	Boys' floor	13.050	8
Yuya Kamoto	Boys' pommel horse	13.325	6
Yuya Kamoto	Boys' rings	14.200	Silver medal
Yuya Kamoto	Boys' parallel bars	13.750	6
Yuya Kamoto	Boys' horizontal bar	14.075	4

Girls

Athlete	Event	Vault		Uneven bars		Beam		Floor		Total	
Athlete	Event	Score	Rank	Score	Rank	Score	Rank	Score	Rank	Score	Rank
Natsumi Sasada	Girls' qualification	14.000	4 Q	13.200	9	13.550	9	12.800	13	53.550	10 Q
Natsumi Sasada	Girls' individual all-around	13.800	6	14.050	3	14.100	5	13.150	8	55.100	4

Athlete	Event	Score	Rank
Natsumi Sasada	Girls' vault	13.662	4

=== Rhythmic gymnastics ===
Team

Athlete	Event	Qualification				Final			
Athlete	Event	Hoops	Ribbons	Total	Rank	Hoops	Ribbons	Total	Rank
Midori Kahata; Momoka Nagai; Sara Ogiso; Shiho Suzuki	Girls' group all-around	23.000	22.900	45.900	2 Q	21.100	21.375	42.475	4

=== Trampoline ===
Athlete	Event	Qualification				Final	
Athlete	Event	Routine 1	Routine 2	Total	Rank	Routine 1	Rank
Ginga Munetomo	Boys' trampoline	27.500	38.700	66.200	3 Q	40.000	Bronze medal
Chisato Doihata	Girls' trampoline	26.600	35.800	62.400	4 Q	36.700	Bronze medal

== Judo ==
Individual

Athlete	Event	Round 1	Round 2	Round 3	Semifinals	Final	Rank
Athlete	Event	Opposition Result	Opposition Result	Opposition Result	Opposition Result	Opposition Result	Rank
Ryosuke Igarashi	Boys' −100 kg	BYE	Pineda (VEN); W 021–000		Mendoza (CUB); W 100–000	Nikiforov (BEL); W 002–000	Gold medal
Miku Tashiro	Girls' −63 kg	BYE	Rak (EST); W 100–000	Shor (ISR); W 101–000	Matic (CRO); W 100–001	Gomes (BRA); W 100–000	Gold medal

Team

Team	Event	Round 1	Round 2	Semifinals	Final	Rank
Team	Event	Opposition Result	Opposition Result	Opposition Result	Opposition Result	Rank
Chiba; Dieulourdes Joseph (HAI); Diau Bauro (FIJ); Alexandra Pop (ROU); Phuc Cai (DEN); Sophio Beridze (GEO); Rijad Dedeic (MNE); Ryosuke Igarashi (JPN)	Mixed Team	BYE	Essen; L 2–5	Did not advance		5
Essen; Lesly Cano (PER); Pedro Rivadulla (ESP); Andrea Krisandova (SVK); Kairat Agibayev (KAZ) [Daryl Lokuku Ngambomo (COD); Miku Tashiro (JPN); Alex Maxell Garcia Mendoza (CUB)	Mixed Team	Munich; W 4–3	Chiba; W 5–2	Cairo; W 5–2	Belgrade; W 6–1	Gold medal

== Rowing ==
Athlete	Event	Heats		Repechage		Semifinals		Final		Overall Rank
Athlete	Event	Time	Rank	Time	Rank	Time	Rank	Time	Rank	Overall Rank
Sae Kitayama	Girls' single sculls	4:03.14	6 QR	4:09.90	4 QC/D	4:16.02	3 QC	4:16.43	5	16

== Sailing ==
Windsurfing

Athlete	Event	Race											Points	Rank
Athlete	Event	1	2	3	4	5	6	7	8	9	10	M*	Points	Rank
Dauya Kuramochi	Boys' Techno 293	4	7	10	8	7	11	7	~~OCS~~	9	4	10	77	8
Shiori Yuri	Girls' Techno 293	12	11	12	14	12	~~OCS~~	12	18	12	12	11	126	13

== Swimming ==
Boys

Athletes	Event	Heat		Semifinal		Final	
Athletes	Event	Time	Position	Time	Position	Time	Position
Yusuke Yamagishi	Boys' 100m backstroke	58.97	19	Did not advance			
Yusuke Yamagishi	Boys' 200m backstroke	2:05.32	7 Q			2:04.67	5
Tatsunari Shoda	Boys' 200m breaststroke	2:21.54	15			Did not advance	
Tatsunari Shoda	Boys' 200m individual medley	2:08.29	18			Did not advance	
Jun Isaji	Boys' 100m butterfly	55.88	19	Did not advance			
Jun Isaji	Boys' 200m butterfly	2:04.13	10			Did not advance	
Takahiro Tsutsumi	Boys' 200m individual medley	2:03.73	5 Q			2:06.18	8
Jun Isaji; Tatsunari Shoda; Takahiro Tsutsumi; Yusuke Yamagishi	Boys' 4 × 100 m freestyle relay	3:32.20	10			Did not advance	
Jun Isaji; Tatsunari Shoda; Takahiro Tsutsumi; Yusuke Yamagishi	Boys' 4 × 100 m medley relay	3:52.55	9			Did not advance	

Girls

Athletes	Event	Heat		Semifinal		Final	
Athletes	Event	Time	Position	Time	Position	Time	Position
Yukiko Watanabe	Girls' 100m backstroke	1:04.23	6 Q	1:04.24	9	Did not advance	
Yukiko Watanabe	Girls' 200m backstroke	2:16.82	8 Q			2:18.36	8
Mina Ochi	Girls' 100m backstroke	1:05.52	18	Did not advance			
Mina Ochi	Girls' 200m backstroke	2:18.26	12			Did not advance	
Maya Hamano	Girls' 100m breaststroke	1:11.32	5 Q	1:10.91	5 Q	1:10.18	4
Maya Hamano	Girls' 200m breaststroke	2:31.67	3 Q			2:29.75	Bronze medal
Mayuko Okada	Girls' 100m butterfly	1:03.75	21	Did not advance			
Mayuko Okada	Girls' 200m butterfly	2:18.72	15			Did not advance	
Yukiko Watanabe; Mina Ochi; Maya Hamano; Mayuko Okada	Girls' 4 × 100 m freestyle relay	4:02.29	10			Did not advance	
Yukiko Watanabe; Mina Ochi; Maya Hamano; Mayuko Okada	Girls' 4 × 100 m medley relay	4:19.00	6 Q			4:16.80	5

Mixed

Athletes	Event	Heat		Semifinal		Final	
Athletes	Event	Time	Position	Time	Position	Time	Position
Jun Isaji; Yusuke Yamagishi; Mina Ochi; Maya Hamano	Mixed 4 × 100 m freestyle relay	3:49.23	14			Did not advance	
Yukiko Watanabe; Tatsinari Shoda; Mayuko Okada; Takahiro Tsutsumi	Mixed 4 × 100 m medley relay	4:06.13	8 Q			4:06.18	7

== Table tennis ==
Individual

Athlete	Event	Round 1		Round 2		Quarterfinals	Semifinals	Final	Rank
Athlete	Event	Group Matches	Rank	Group Matches	Rank	Quarterfinals	Semifinals	Final	Rank
Koki Niwa	Boys' singles	Kulpa (POL); W 3–0 (11–6, 11–4, 11–7)	1 Q	Hageraats (NED); W 3–0 (11–3, 11–6, 11–2)	1 Q	Onaolapo (NGR); W 4–2 (8–11, 8–11, 11–8, 11–9, 11–9, 13–11)	Gauzy (FRA); W 4–0 (11–7, 14–12, 11–4, 11–8)	Hung (TPE); W 4–2 (9–11, 11–8, 13–11, 13–15, 11–7, 15–13)	Gold medal
Koki Niwa	Boys' singles	Wagner (GER); W 3–0 (11–7, 11–5, 11–7)	1 Q	Lakatos (HUN); W 3–0 (11–5, 11–7, 11–2)	1 Q	Onaolapo (NGR); W 4–2 (8–11, 8–11, 11–8, 11–9, 11–9, 13–11)	Gauzy (FRA); W 4–0 (11–7, 14–12, 11–4, 11–8)	Hung (TPE); W 4–2 (9–11, 11–8, 13–11, 13–15, 11–7, 15–13)	Gold medal
Koki Niwa	Boys' singles	Mejía (ESA); W 3–0 (11–4, 11–5, 11–4)	1 Q	Kim (KOR); W 3–0 (11–7, 11–4, 7–11 11–3)	1 Q	Onaolapo (NGR); W 4–2 (8–11, 8–11, 11–8, 11–9, 11–9, 13–11)	Gauzy (FRA); W 4–0 (11–7, 14–12, 11–4, 11–8)	Hung (TPE); W 4–2 (9–11, 11–8, 13–11, 13–15, 11–7, 15–13)	Gold medal
Ayuka Tanioka	Girls' singles	Wu (NZL); W 3–0 (11–7, 11–3, 11–4)	1 Q	Meshref (EGY); W 3–1 (12–10, 10–12, 11–7, 11–4)	2 Q	Sawettabut (THA); L 0–4 (7–11, 4–11, 10–12, 8–11)	Did not advance		5
Ayuka Tanioka	Girls' singles	Li (SIN); W 3–2 (11–9, 11–5, 9–11, 16–18, 11–6)	1 Q	Noskova (RUS); W 3–1 (11–7, 7–11, 12–10, 11–7)	2 Q	Sawettabut (THA); L 0–4 (7–11, 4–11, 10–12, 8–11)	Did not advance		5
Ayuka Tanioka	Girls' singles	Loveridge (GBR); W 3–1 (9–11, 11–6, 11–4, 11–2)	1 Q	Gu (CHN); L 0–3 (2–11, 2–11, 10–12)	2 Q	Sawettabut (THA); L 0–4 (7–11, 4–11, 10–12, 8–11)	Did not advance		5

Team

Athlete	Event	Round 1		Round 2	Quarterfinals	Semifinals	Final	Rank
Athlete	Event	Group matches	Rank	Round 2	Quarterfinals	Semifinals	Final	Rank
Japan; Ayuka Tanioka (JPN); Koki Niwa (JPN)	Mixed team	Brazil; Kumahara (BRA); Jouti (BRA); W 3–0 (3–0, 3–0, 3–0)	1 Q	Hong Kong; Ng (HKG); Chiu (HKG); W 2–0 (3–2, 3–2)	Singapore; Li (SIN); Chew (SIN); W 2–1 (0–3, 3–1, 3–2)	Intercontinental 1 Gu (CHN); Hmam (TUN); W 2–1 (0–3, 3–0, 3–1)	Korea; Yang (KOR); Kim (KOR); W 2–1 (2–3, 3–2, 3–2)	Gold medal
Japan; Ayuka Tanioka (JPN); Koki Niwa (JPN)	Mixed team	Pan America 1 Hsing (USA); Gavilan (PAR); W 3–0 (3–2, 3–0, 3–0)	1 Q	Hong Kong; Ng (HKG); Chiu (HKG); W 2–0 (3–2, 3–2)	Singapore; Li (SIN); Chew (SIN); W 2–1 (0–3, 3–1, 3–2)	Intercontinental 1 Gu (CHN); Hmam (TUN); W 2–1 (0–3, 3–0, 3–1)	Korea; Yang (KOR); Kim (KOR); W 2–1 (2–3, 3–2, 3–2)	Gold medal
Japan; Ayuka Tanioka (JPN); Koki Niwa (JPN)	Mixed team	BYE	1 Q	Hong Kong; Ng (HKG); Chiu (HKG); W 2–0 (3–2, 3–2)	Singapore; Li (SIN); Chew (SIN); W 2–1 (0–3, 3–1, 3–2)	Intercontinental 1 Gu (CHN); Hmam (TUN); W 2–1 (0–3, 3–0, 3–1)	Korea; Yang (KOR); Kim (KOR); W 2–1 (2–3, 3–2, 3–2)	Gold medal

== Tennis ==
Singles

Athlete	Event	Round 1	Round 2	Quarterfinals	Semifinals	Final	Rank
Yasutaka Uchiyama	Boys' singles	Džumhur (BIH); L 0–2 (5–7, 2–6)	Consolation; Acosta (ECU); L 1–2 (3–6, 6–4, [4–10])	Did not advance			
Sachie Ishizu	Girls' singles	Kremen (BLR); L 0–2 (3–6, 3–6)	Consolation; Ysidora (INA); W 2–0 (w/o)	Consolation; Pérez (VEN); W 2–0 (6–1, 6–3)	Consolation; Jodoin (CAN); W 2–0 (6–1, 7–6)	Consolation; Friedsam (GER); W 2–0 (6–2, 7–5)	
Emi Mutaguchi	Girls' singles	Putintseva (RUS); L 0–2 (3–6, 4–6)	Consolation; Royg (PAR); W 2–0 (6–1, 6–4)	Consolation; Paliivets (CAN); W 2–0 (3–0RET)	Consolation; Friedsam (GER); L 0–2 (0–6, 3–6)	Did not advance	

Doubles

Athlete	Event	Round 1	Quarterfinals	Semifinals	Final	Rank
Liang-Chi Huang (TPE); Yasutaka Uchiyama (JPN)	Boys' doubles	Galeano (PAR); Rodriguez (VEN); L 0–2 (4–6, 4–6)	Did not advance			
Sachie Ishizu (JPN); Emi Mutaguchi (JPN)	Girls' doubles	Kumkhum (THA); Ysidora (INA); W 2–0 (6–1, 6–4)	Babos (HUN); Mestach (BEL); L 1–2 (6–4, 3–6, [12–14])	Did not advance		

== Triathlon ==
Yuka Sato won the first gold medal of the Youth Olympic Games.

Girls

Triathlete	Event	Swimming	Transit 1	Cycling	Transit 2	Running	Total time	Rank
Yuka Sato	individual	9:32	0:35	32:10	0:27	18:05	1:00:49.69	1st place, gold medalist(s)

Men's

Athlete	Event	Swim (1.5 km)	Trans 1	Bike (40 km)	Trans 2	Run (10 km)	Total	Rank
Yuki Kubono	individual	9:21	0:35	30:26	0:25	18:39	59:26.04	26

Mixed

Athlete	Event	Total times per athlete (swim 250 m, bike 7 km, run 1.7 km)	Total group time	Rank
Mingxiu Ma (CHN); Leong Tim Law (HKG); Karolina Solovyova (KAZ); Yuki Kubono (JPN)	Mixed team relay Asia 2	22:55; 20:43; 23:54; 20:08	1:27:40.62	13
Sato Yuka (JPN); Ji Hong Lee (KOR); Wai Sum Vincci Hui (HKG); Ru Cheng (CHN)	Mixed team relay Asia 1	20:16; 20:06; 22:19; 20:39	1:23:20.88	8

== Volleyball ==
Squad List	Event	Group Stage		Semifinal	Bronze Medal Match	Rank
Squad List	Event	Group A	Rank	Semifinal	Bronze Medal Match	Rank
Yoko Onuma; Nozomi Inoue; Chizu Ichikawa; Anna Fukami (C); Yui Kageyama; Yukiko Akashi; Saaya Karaki; Ayaka Mori; Mami Ogonuki; Sayaka Tokiwa; Akari Imakado; Mayu Koizumi	Girls' Volleyball	Singapore; W 3–0 (25–9, 25–16, 25–9)	2 Q	United States; L 0–3 (20–25, 23–25, 22–25)	Peru; L 1–3 (25–22, 28–30, 11–25, 17–25)	4
Yoko Onuma; Nozomi Inoue; Chizu Ichikawa; Anna Fukami (C); Yui Kageyama; Yukiko Akashi; Saaya Karaki; Ayaka Mori; Mami Ogonuki; Sayaka Tokiwa; Akari Imakado; Mayu Koizumi	Girls' Volleyball	Peru; L 0–3 (22–25, 19–25, 18–25)	2 Q	United States; L 0–3 (20–25, 23–25, 22–25)	Peru; L 1–3 (25–22, 28–30, 11–25, 17–25)	4

== Weightlifting ==
Athlete	Event	Snatch	Clean & jerk	Total	Rank
Miku Shichinohe	Girls' +63kg	80	93	173	12

== Wrestling ==
freestyle

Athlete	Event	Pools		Final	Rank
Athlete	Event	Groups	Rank	Final	Rank
Yuki Takahashi	Boys' 54 kg	Ghanmi (TUN); W T. Fall (6–0, 7–0)	1	Guluyev (AZE); W 2–0 (4–0, 4–0)	Gold medal
Yuki Takahashi	Boys' 54 kg	Daylak (TUR); W 2–0 (3–0, 3–0)	1	Guluyev (AZE); W 2–0 (4–0, 4–0)	Gold medal
Yuki Takahashi	Boys' 54 kg	Serrata (DOM); W Fall (6–0)	1	Guluyev (AZE); W 2–0 (4–0, 4–0)	Gold medal
Yuki Takahashi	Boys' 54 kg	Mbambi (CGO); W T. Fall (7–0, 7–0)	1	Guluyev (AZE); W 2–0 (4–0, 4–0)	Gold medal
Yu Miyahara	Girls' 46kg	Olli (FIN); W 2–0 (1+–1, 5–0)	1	Leorda (MDA); W 2–0 (4–2, 6–0)	Gold medal
Yu Miyahara	Girls' 46kg	Segura (VEN); W 2–0 (4–1, 2–0)	1	Leorda (MDA); W 2–0 (4–2, 6–0)	Gold medal
