= Tajikistan at the 2010 Summer Youth Olympics =

- IOC code: TJK
- NOC: Tajikistan Olympic Committee

in Singapore
- Competitors: 6 in 5 sports
- Flag bearer: Bakhodur Kadirov
- Medals Ranked 70th: Gold 0 Silver 1 Bronze 1 Total 2

Summer Youth Olympics appearances
- 2010; 2014; 2018; 2026

Tajikistan participated in the 2010 Summer Youth Olympics in Singapore.

The Tajikistan team consisted of 6 athletes competing in 5 sports: archery, athletics, boxing, taekwondo and wrestling.

== Medalists ==
Medal	Name	Sport	Event	Date
Silver	Bakhodur Kadirov	Wrestling	Boys' freestyle 63 kg	17 Aug
Bronze	Shukrona Sharifova	Taekwondo	Girls' 44 kg	16 Aug

== Archery ==
Girls

Athlete	Event	Ranking Round		Round of 32	Round of 16	Quarterfinals	Semifinals	Final	
Athlete	Event	Score	Seed	Opposition Score	Opposition Score	Opposition Score	Opposition Score	Opposition Score	Rank
Kristina Zaynutdinova	Girls’ Individual	494	30	Segina (RUS); L 0-6	Did not advance				17

Mixed Team

Athlete	Event	Partner	Round of 32	Round of 16	Quarterfinals	Semifinals	Final	
Athlete	Event	Partner	Opposition Score	Opposition Score	Opposition Score	Opposition Score	Opposition Score	Rank
Kristina Zaynutdinova	Mixed Team	Min Beom Park (KOR)	Loh (SIN)/ Rivas (ESP); L 3-7	Did not advance				17

== Athletics ==
=== Boys ===
Track and Road Events

Athletes	Event	Qualification		Final	
Athletes	Event	Result	Rank	Result	Rank
Davron Atabaev	Boys’ 200m	22.61	16 qC	22.24	15

Field Events

Athletes	Event	Qualification		Final	
Athletes	Event	Result	Rank	Result	Rank
Abduqodir Barotov	Boys’ Hammer Throw	66.96	9 qB	65.92	11

== Boxing ==
Boys

Athlete	Event	Preliminaries	Semifinals	Final	Rank
Siyovush Zukhurov	Heavyweight (91kg)		Fabio Turchi (ITA); L 0-7	3rd place Bout; Umit Can Patrir (TUR); L RSC R1 2:24	4

== Taekwondo ==
Athlete	Event	Preliminary	Quarterfinal	Semifinal	Final	Rank
Shukrona Sharifova	Girls' -44kg	BYE	Li Zhaoyi (CHN); W 3-1	Iryna Romoldanova (UKR); L 0-3	Did not advance	Bronze medal

== Wrestling ==
Freestyle

Athlete	Event	Pools		Final	Rank
Athlete	Event	Groups	Rank	Final	Rank
Bakhodur Kadirov	Boys' 63kg	Boudraa (ALG); W T. Fall (6–0, 7–0)	1	Pshnatlov (RUS); L Fall (0–4)	Silver medal
Bakhodur Kadirov	Boys' 63kg	Pereira (GBS); W 2–0 (4–0, 3–0)	1	Pshnatlov (RUS); L Fall (0–4)	Silver medal
Bakhodur Kadirov	Boys' 63kg	Murphy (USA); W 2–0 (5–0, 4–2)	1	Pshnatlov (RUS); L Fall (0–4)	Silver medal
