= Gymnastics at the 2010 Summer Youth Olympics – Men's vault =

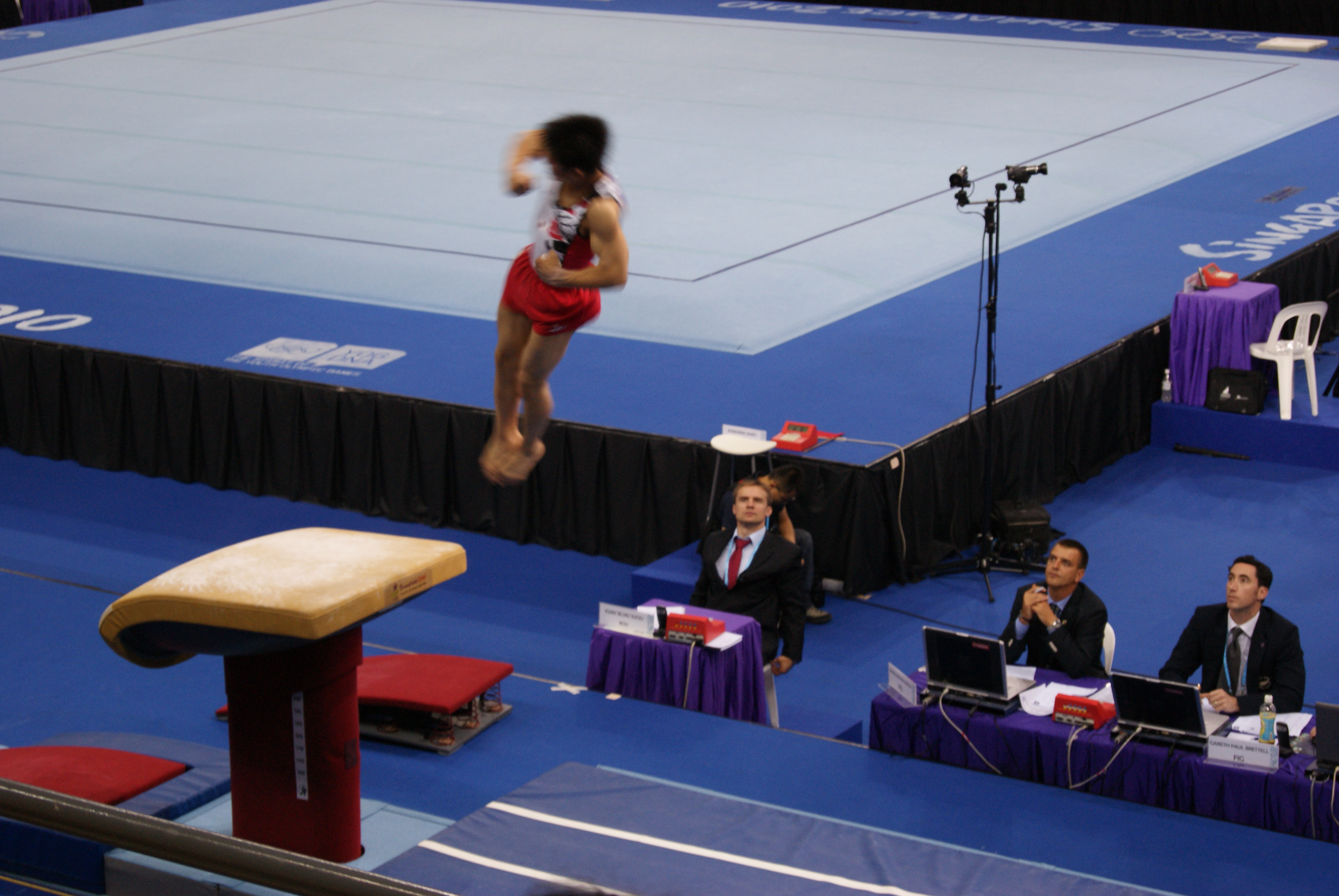
Japanese gymnast Yuya Kamoto performing a vault during the 2010 Summer Youth Olympics

These are the results of the men's vault competition, one of five events for female competitors of the artistic gymnastics discipline contested in the gymnastics at the 2010 Summer Youth Olympics in Singapore. The qualification and final rounds took place on 16 August at the Bishan Sports Hall.

== Medalists ==
| Gold | Silver | Bronze |
|---|---|---|
| Ganbatyn Erdenebold; Mongolia | Ferhat Ancan; Turkey | Néstor Abad; Spain |

== Results ==
=== Qualification ===
41 gymnasts competed in the vault event in the artistic gymnastics qualification round on August 16. The eight highest scoring gymnasts advanced to the final on August 22.

=== Final ===
| Rank | Gymnast | # | A-score | B-score | Penalty | Average | Total |
|---|---|---|---|---|---|---|---|
| Gold medal | Ganbatyn Erdenebold (MGL) | 1 | 6.6 | 9.150 | — | 15.750 | 15.662 |
| Gold medal | Ganbatyn Erdenebold (MGL) | 2 | 6.2 | 9.375 | — | 15.575 | 15.662 |
| Silver medal | Ferhat Arıcan (TUR) | 1 | 5.8 | 9.375 | — | 15.175 | 15.650 |
| Silver medal | Ferhat Arıcan (TUR) | 2 | 6.6 | 9.525 | — | 16.125 | 15.650 |
| Bronze medal | Néstor Abad (ESP) | 1 | 6.2 | 9.375 | — | 15.475 | 15.450 |
| Bronze medal | Néstor Abad (ESP) | 2 | 6.2 | 9.225 | — | 15.425 | 15.450 |
| 4 | Arthur Mariano (BRA) | 1 | 6.6 | 9.575 | — | 16.175 | 15.400 |
| 4 | Arthur Mariano (BRA) | 2 | 6.2 | 8.725 | — | 14.625 | 15.400 |
| 5 | Weena Chokpaoumpai (THA) | 1 | 5.4 | 9.600 | — | 15.000 | 15.362 |
| 5 | Weena Chokpaoumpai (THA) | 2 | 6.2 | 9.525 | — | 15.725 | 15.362 |
| 6 | Daniil Kazachkov (RUS) | 1 | 6.6 | 9.225 | — | 15.825 | 14.962 |
| 6 | Daniil Kazachkov (RUS) | 2 | 5.8 | 8.400 | — | 14.100 | 14.962 |
| 7 | Javier Cervantes (MEX) | 1 | 6.2 | 8.390 | — | 14.400 | 14.850 |
| 7 | Javier Cervantes (MEX) | 2 | 6.2 | 9.200 | — | 15.300 | 14.850 |
| 8 | Oleg Stepko (UKR) | 1 | 6.6 | 8.125 | — | 14.625 | 14.425 |
| 8 | Oleg Stepko (UKR) | 2 | 4.6 | 9.625 | — | 14.225 | 14.425 |
