= Wrestling at the 2010 Summer Youth Olympics – Boys' freestyle 100 kg =

The boys' 100 kg tournament in wrestling at the 2010 Summer Youth Olympics was held on August 17 at the International Convention Centre.

The event limited competitors to a maximum of 100 kilograms of body mass. The tournament had two groups where wrestlers compete in a round-robin format. The winners of each group would go on to play for the gold medal, second placers played for the bronze medal while everyone else played for classification depending on where they ranked in the group stage.

== Medalists ==
| Gold | Silver | Bronze |
|---|---|---|
| Ali Magomedabirov; Azerbaijan | Abraham Ruano; Cuba | Satyawart Kadian; India |

== Group stages ==
=== Group A ===
| Athlete | Pld | C. Points | T. Points |
|---|---|---|---|
| Ali Magomedabirov (AZE) | 3 | 10 | 10 |
| Geno Petriashvili (GEO) | 3 | 7 | 15 |
| Oyunbold Enkhtugs (MGL) | 3 | 6 | 6 |
| Manuolefoaga Sualevai (ASA) | 3 | 0 | 0 |

| Ali Magomedabirov (AZE) | 2-0 (1–0, 2–1) | Oyunbold Enkhtugs (MGL) |
| Geno Petriashvili (GEO) | T. Fall (6–0, 5–0) | Manuolefoaga Sualevai (ASA) |
| Ali Magomedabirov (AZE) | 2-0 (2–0, 3–0) | Geno Petriashvili (GEO) |
| Oyunbold Enkhtugs (MGL) | Fall (4–0) | Manuolefoaga Sualevai (ASA) |
| Ali Magomedabirov (AZE) | Fall (2–0) | Manuolefoaga Sualevai (ASA) |
| Oyunbold Enkhtugs (MGL) | 0-2 (1-3, 0-1) | Geno Petriachvili (GEO) |

=== Group B ===
| Athlete | Pld | C. Points | T. Points |
|---|---|---|---|
| Abraham Ruano (CUB) | 3 | 9 | 12 |
| Satyawart Kadian (IND) | 3 | 6 | 4 |
| Parmvir Dhesi (CAN) | 3 | 3 | 3 |
| Andries Schutte (RSA) | 3 | 2 | 4 |

| Parmvir Dhesi (CAN) | 2-0 (2–0, 1–0) | Andries Schutte (RSA) |
| Satyawart Kadian (IND) | 0-2 (0-1, 0-1) | Abraham Ruano (CUB) |
| Parmvir Dhesi (CAN) | 0-2 (0-1, 0-1) | Satyawart Kadian (IND) |
| Andries Schutte (RSA) | 0-2 (3-4, 0-1) | Abraham Ruano (CUB) |
| Parmvir Dhesi (CAN) | 0-2 (0-1, 0-3) | Abraham Ruano (CUB) |
| Andries Schutte (RSA) | 1-2 (0-1, 1–0, 0-1) | Satyawart Kadian (IND) |

== Classification ==
=== 7th-place match ===
| Manuolefoaga Sualevai (ASA) | 0-2 (0-2, 0-4) | Andries Schutte (RSA) |

=== 5th-place match ===
| Oyunbold Enkhtugs (MGL) | 2-1 (1-1, 2–0, 2–0) | Parmvir Dhesi (CAN) |

=== Bronze-medal match ===
| Geno Petriashvili (GEO) | 0-2 (1-2, 0-1) | Satyawart Kadian (IND) |

=== Gold-medal match ===
| Ali Magomedabirov (AZE) | 2-0 (1–0, 1–0) | Abraham Ruano (CUB) |

== Final rankings ==
| Rank | Athlete |
|---|---|
| Gold medal | Ali Magomedabirov (AZE) |
| Silver medal | Abraham Ruano (CUB) |
| Bronze medal | Satyawart Kadian (IND) |
| 4 | Geno Petriashvili (GEO) |
| 5 | Oyunbold Enkhtugs (MGL) |
| 6 | Parmvir Dhesi (CAN) |
| 7 | Andries Schutte (RSA) |
| 8 | Manuolefoaga Sualevai (ASA) |
