= Wrestling at the 2010 Summer Youth Olympics – Boys' freestyle 63 kg =

The boys' 63 kg tournament in wrestling at the 2010 Summer Youth Olympics was held on August 17 at the International Convention Centre.

The event limited competitors to a maximum of 63 kilograms of body mass. The tournament had two groups where wrestlers compete in a round-robin format. The winners of each group would go on to play for the gold medal, second placers played for the bronze medal while everyone else played for classification depending on where they ranked in the group stage.

On 15 October 2010, the International Olympic Committee announced Johnny Pilay who finished fifth had tested positive for a banned diuretic, furosemide. He was disqualified from the event.

== Medalists ==
Gold	Silver	Bronze
Azamatbi Pshnatlov; Russia	Bakhodur Kadirov; Tajikistan	Irakli Mosidze; Georgia

== Group stages ==
=== Group A ===
Athlete	Pld	C. Points	T. Points
Azamatbi Pshnatlov (RUS)	3	11	26
Irakli Mosidze (GEO)	3	7	26
Johnny Pilay (ECU)	3	4	9
Haris Fazlic (AUS)	3	0	0

Azamatbi Pshnatlov (RUS)	2-0 (3–0, 8–0)	Johnny Pilay (ECU)
Irakli Mosidze (GEO)	T. Fall (7–0, 9–0)	Haris Fazlic (AUS)
Azamatbi Pshnatlov (RUS)	T. Fall (7–0, 6–0)	Irakli Mosidze (GEO)
Johnny Pilay (ECU)	2-0 (1–0, 6–0)	Haris Fazlic (AUS)
Azamatbi Pshnatlov (RUS)	Fall (3–0)	Haris Fazlic (AUS)
Johnny Pilay (ECU)	0-2 (2-3, 0-7)	Irakli Mosidze (GEO)

=== Group B ===
Athlete	Pld	C. Points	T. Points
Bakhodur Kadirov (TJK)	3	10	29
Quinton Murphy (USA)	3	9	20
Mohamed Boudraa (ALG)	3	3	6
Amadeus Pereira (GBS)	3	1	11

Bakhodur Kadirov (TJK)	T. Fall (6–0, 7–0)	Mohamed Boudraa (ALG)
Amadeus Pereira (GBS)	Fall (0-4)	Quinton Murphy (USA)
Bakhodur Kadirov (TJK)	2-0 (4–0, 3–0)	Amadeus Pereira (GBS)
Mohamed Boudraa (ALG)	T.Fall (0-7, 0-7)	Quinton Murphy (USA)
Bakhodur Kadirov (TJK)	2-0 (5–0, 4–2)	Quinton Murphy (USA)
Mohamed Boudraa (ALG)	2-1 (5–3, 0-7, 1–1)	Amadeus Pereira (GBS)

== Classification ==
=== 7th-place match ===
Haris Fazlic (AUS)	0-2 (2-5, 3-6)	Amadeus Pereira (GBS)

=== 5th-place match ===
Johnny Pilay (ECU)	2-0 (1–0, 3–0)	Mohamed Boudraa (ALG)

=== Bronze-medal match ===
Irakli Mosidze (GEO)	2-0 (7–4, 6–0)	Quinton Murphy (USA)

=== Gold-medal match ===
Azamatbi Pshnatlov (RUS)	Fall (4–0)	Bakhodur Kadirov (TJK)

== Final rankings ==
Rank	Athlete
Gold medal	Azamatbi Pshnatlov (RUS)
Silver medal	Bakhodur Kadirov (TJK)
Bronze medal	Irakli Mosidze (GEO)
4	Quinton Murphy (USA)
5	Vacant
6	Mohamed Boudraa (ALG)
7	Amadeus Pereira (GBS)
8	Haris Fazlic (AUS)
DQ	Johnny Pilay (ECU)

- Johnny Pilay of Ecuador originally finished 5th, but in October 2010, it was announced that he tested positive for diuretic Furosemide.
