= Wrestling at the 2010 Summer Youth Olympics – Boys' Greco-Roman 50 kg =

The boys' 50 kg Greco-Roman tournament in wrestling at the 2010 Summer Youth Olympics was held on August 15 at the International Convention Centre.

The event limited competitors to a maximum of 50 kilograms of body mass. The tournament had two groups where wrestlers compete in a round-robin format. The winners of each group would go on to play for the gold medal, second placers played for the bronze medal while everyone else played for classification depending on where they ranked in the group stage.

On 15 October 2010, the International Olympic Committee announced that Nurbek Hakkulov, who won a silver medal for Uzbekistan had tested positive for a banned diuretic, furosemide. Hakkulov was disqualified and stripped of his silver medal, although no decision was taken on whether to promote Shadybek Sulaimanov and Johan Rodriguez Banguela in the event.

== Medalists ==
Gold	Silver	Bronze
Elman Mukhtarov; Azerbaijan	Vacant	Shadybek Sulaimanov; Kyrgyzstan

== Group stages ==
=== Group A ===
Athlete	Pld	C. Points	T. Points
Elman Mukhtarov (AZE)	2	6	13
Johan Rodriguez Banguela (CUB)	2	4	5
Andrei Pikuza (BLR)	2	0	0

Andrei Pikuza (BLR)	0-2 (0-3, 0-3)	Elman Mukhtarov (AZE)
Andrei Pikuza (BLR)	0-2 (0-1, 0-3)	Johan Rodriguez Banguela (CUB)
Elman Mukhtarov (AZE)	2-0 (2–0, 5–1)	Johan Rodriguez Banguela (CUB)

=== Group B ===
Athlete	Pld	C. Points	T. Points
Nurbek Hakkulov (UZB)	3	10	29
Shadybek Sulaimanov (KGZ)	3	7	20
Amine Boughazi (ALG)	3	4	15
Paal Eirik Gundersen (NOR)	3	1	4

Shadybek Sulaimanov (KGZ)	0-2 (0-1, 0-3)	Nurbek Hakkulov (UZB)
Amine Boughazi (ALG)	2-0 (5–1, 4–3)	Paal Eirik Gundersen (NOR)
Shadybek Sulaimanov (KGZ)	2-0 (6–0, 1–0)	Amine Boughazi (ALG)
Nurbek Hakkulov (UZB)	T. Fall (6–0, 6–0)	Paal Eirik Gundersen (NOR)
Shadybek Sulaimanov (KGZ)	T. Fall (7–0, 6–0)	Paal Eirik Gundersen (NOR)
Nurbek Hakkulov (UZB)	2-0 (9–4, 4–2)	Amine Boughazi (ALG)

== Classification ==
=== 5th-place match ===
Andrei Pikuza (BLR)	Fall (9–0)	Amine Boughazi (ALG)

=== Bronze-medal match ===
Johan Rodriguez Banguela (CUB)	1-2 (1–0, 0-1, 0-3)	Shadybek Sulaimanov (KGZ)

=== Gold-medal match ===
Elman Mukhtarov (AZE)	2-0 (3–0, 4–0)	Nurbek Hakkulov (UZB)

== Final rankings ==
Rank	Athlete
1st place, gold medalist(s)	Elman Mukhtarov (AZE)
2nd place, silver medalist(s)	Vacant
3rd place, bronze medalist(s)	ShadyKeb Sulaimanov (KGZ)
4	Johan Rodriguez Banguela (CUB)
5	Andrei Pikuza (BLR)
6	Amine Boughazi (ALG)
7	Paal Eirik Gundersen (NOR)
DQ	Nurbek Hakkulov (UZB)

- Nurbek Hakkulov of Uzbekistan originally finished second, but in October 2010, it was announced that he tested positive for diuretic Furosemide.
