= Ireland at the 2010 Summer Youth Olympics =

- IOC code: IRL
- NOC: Olympic Council of Ireland
- Website: www.olympicsport.ie

in Singapore
- Competitors: 25 in 8 sports
- Flag bearer: Kate Veale
- Medals Ranked 50th: Gold 1 Silver 0 Bronze 0 Total 1

Summer Youth Olympics appearances
- 2010; 2014; 2018

Ireland competed at the 2010 Summer Youth Olympics, the inaugural Youth Olympic Games, held in Singapore from 14 August to 26 August 2010.

== Medalists ==
| Medal | Name | Sport | Event | Date |
|---|---|---|---|---|
| Gold | Ryan Burnett | Boxing | Men's Light Fly 48kg | 25 Aug |

== Athletics ==
=== Boys ===
Track and Road Events

| Athletes | Event | Qualification | | Final | |
| Athletes | Event | Result | Rank | Result | Rank |
|---|---|---|---|---|---|
| Mark English | Boys' 1000m | 2:25.39 | 6 Q | 2:24.95 | 8 |

=== Girls ===
Track and Road Events

| Athletes | Event | Qualification | | Final | |
| Athletes | Event | Result | Rank | Result | Rank |
|---|---|---|---|---|---|
| Kate Veale | Girls’ 5km Walk | | | 22:36.97 | 4 |

== Boxing ==
Boys

| Athlete | Event | Preliminaries | Semifinals | Final | Rank |
|---|---|---|---|---|---|
| Ryan Burnett | Light Flyweight (48kg) | Vadzim Kirylenka (BLR); W 12-0 | Zohidjon Hoorboyev (UZB); W 2-1 | Salman Alizada (AZE); W 13-6 | Gold medal |
| Joe Ward | Middleweight (75kg) | Damien Hooper (AUS); L 2-4 | Did not advance | 5th place bout Adlet Rakishev (KAZ); L wd | 6 |

== Field hockey ==
| Squad List | Event | Group stage | | 5th place match | |
| Squad List | Event | Opposition Score | Rank | Opposition Score | Rank |
|---|---|---|---|---|---|
| Lucy Camlin; Jenna Holmes; Rebecca Barry; Emily Beatty; Chloe Brown; Amy Cooke; Leah Ewart (C); Lisa McCarthy; Kerri McDonald; Antonia McGrath; Lucy McKee; Katerine Morris; Katie Mullan; Joanne Orr; Roisin Upton; Amy-Kate Trevor | Girls' Field hockey | Netherlands; L 1-3 | 5 | South Africa; W 3-1 | 5 |
| Lucy Camlin; Jenna Holmes; Rebecca Barry; Emily Beatty; Chloe Brown; Amy Cooke; Leah Ewart (C); Lisa McCarthy; Kerri McDonald; Antonia McGrath; Lucy McKee; Katerine Morris; Katie Mullan; Joanne Orr; Roisin Upton; Amy-Kate Trevor | Girls' Field hockey | New Zealand; L 2-3 | 5 | South Africa; W 3-1 | 5 |
| Lucy Camlin; Jenna Holmes; Rebecca Barry; Emily Beatty; Chloe Brown; Amy Cooke; Leah Ewart (C); Lisa McCarthy; Kerri McDonald; Antonia McGrath; Lucy McKee; Katerine Morris; Katie Mullan; Joanne Orr; Roisin Upton; Amy-Kate Trevor | Girls' Field hockey | Argentina; L 0-3 | 5 | South Africa; W 3-1 | 5 |
| Lucy Camlin; Jenna Holmes; Rebecca Barry; Emily Beatty; Chloe Brown; Amy Cooke; Leah Ewart (C); Lisa McCarthy; Kerri McDonald; Antonia McGrath; Lucy McKee; Katerine Morris; Katie Mullan; Joanne Orr; Roisin Upton; Amy-Kate Trevor | Girls' Field hockey | South Korea; L 2-3 | 5 | South Africa; W 3-1 | 5 |
| Lucy Camlin; Jenna Holmes; Rebecca Barry; Emily Beatty; Chloe Brown; Amy Cooke; Leah Ewart (C); Lisa McCarthy; Kerri McDonald; Antonia McGrath; Lucy McKee; Katerine Morris; Katie Mullan; Joanne Orr; Roisin Upton; Amy-Kate Trevor | Girls' Field hockey | South Africa; W 1-0 | 5 | South Africa; W 3-1 | 5 |

== Modern pentathlon ==
| Athlete | Event | Fencing (Épée One Touch) | | | Swimming (200m Freestyle) | | | Running & Shooting (3000m, Laser Pistol) | | | Total Points | Final Rank |
| Athlete | Event | Results | Rank | Points | Time | Rank | Points | Time | Rank | Points | Total Points | Final Rank |
|---|---|---|---|---|---|---|---|---|---|---|---|---|
| Emily Greenan | Girls' Individual | 8-15 | 19 | 680 | 2:21.10 | 6 | 1096 | 14:15.80 | 21 | 1580 | 3356 | 21 |
| Emily Greenan (IRL); Jorge Camacho (MEX) | Mixed Relay | 55-37 | 4 | 910 | 2:06.35 | 13 | 1284 | 16:11.37 | 12 | 2196 | 4390 | 10 |

== Rowing ==
| Athlete | Event | Heats | | Repechage | | Semifinals | | Final | | Overall Rank |
| Athlete | Event | Time | Rank | Time | Rank | Time | Rank | Time | Rank | Overall Rank |
|---|---|---|---|---|---|---|---|---|---|---|
| Denise Walsh | Girls' Single Sculls | 3:56.55 | 2 QR | 4:05.00 | 2 QA/B | 4:10.04 | 6 QB | DNS | | |

== Sailing ==
One Person Dinghy

| Athlete | Event | Race | | | | | | | | | | | | Points | Rank |
| Athlete | Event | 1 | 2 | 3 | 4 | 5 | 6 | 7 | 8 | 9 | 10 | 11 | M* | Points | Rank |
|---|---|---|---|---|---|---|---|---|---|---|---|---|---|---|---|
| Sophie Murphy | Girls' Byte CII | 14 | 19 | ~~24~~ | ~~20~~ | 19 | 12 | 10 | 12 | 8 | 13 | 11 | 8 | 126 | 17 |

== Tennis ==
Singles

| Athlete | Event | Round 1 | Round 2 | Quarterfinals | Semifinals | Final | Rank |
|---|---|---|---|---|---|---|---|
| John Morrissey | Boys' Singles | Acosta (ECU); W 2-0 (7-5, 6-1) | Beretta (PER); W 2-0 (6-2, 7-6) | Bhambri (IND); L 0-2 (4-6, 4-6) | Did not advance | | |

Doubles

| Athlete | Event | Round 1 | Quarterfinals | Semifinals | Final | Rank |
|---|---|---|---|---|---|---|
| Alessandro Colella (ITA); John Morrissey (IRL) | Boys' Doubles | Horanský (SVK); Kovalík (SVK); L 0-2 (2-6, 5-7) | Did not advance | | | |

== Triathlon ==
Girls

| Triathlete | Event | Swimming | Transit 1 | Cycling | Transit 2 | Running | Total time | Rank |
|---|---|---|---|---|---|---|---|---|
| Laura Casey | Individual | 10:00 | 0:32 | 31:45 | 0:28 | 19:55 | 1:02:40.87 | 9 |

Mixed

| Athlete | Event | Total Times per Athlete (Swim 250 m, Bike 7 km, Run 1.7 km) | Total Group Time | Rank |
|---|---|---|---|---|
| Marlene Gomez (GER); Jeremy Obozil (FRA); Laura Casey (IRL); Lukas Kocar (CZE) | Mixed Team Relay; Europe 2 | 20:53; 19:47; 21:54; 19:37 | 1:22:11.38 | 4 |
