= Ecuador at the 2010 Summer Youth Olympics =

- IOC code: ECU
- NOC: Comité Olímpico Ecuatoriano

in Singapore
- Competitors: 14 in 8 sports
- Flag bearer: Roberto Quiroz
- Medals Ranked 74th: Gold 0 Silver 1 Bronze 0 Total 1

Summer Youth Olympics appearances
- 2010; 2014; 2018; 2026

Ecuador participated in the 2010 Summer Youth Olympics in Singapore.

The Ecuador squad consisted of 14 athletes competing in 8 sports: aquatics (swimming), athletics, boxing, table tennis, tennis, triathlon, weightlifting and wrestling.

== Medalists ==
Medal	Name	Sport	Event	Date
Silver	Oscar Villavicencio	Athletics	Boys' 10km Race Walk	22 Aug

== Athletics ==
=== Boys ===
Track and Road Events

Athletes	Event	Qualification		Final	
Athletes	Event	Result	Rank	Result	Rank
Oscar Villavicencio	Boys’ 10km Walk			43:46.00	Silver medal

=== Girls ===
Track and Road Events

Athletes	Event	Qualification		Final	
Athletes	Event	Result	Rank	Result	Rank
Ana Bustos	Girls’ 5km Walk			23:43.81	9

== Boxing ==
Boys

Athlete	Event	Preliminaries	Semifinals	Final	Rank
Ytalo Perea	Light Heavyweight (81kg)		Aksin (TUR); L 0–7	3rd place bout Begaliev (UZB); L 2–5	4

== Swimming ==
Athletes	Event	Heat		Semifinal		Final	
Athletes	Event	Time	Position	Time	Position	Time	Position
Jorge Masson	Boys’ 200m Freestyle	1:59.08	37			Did not advance	
Jorge Masson	Boys’ 400m Freestyle	4:08.80	23			Did not advance	
Diana Chang	Girls’ 50m Freestyle	27.65	26	Did not advance			
Diana Chang	Girls’ 100m Backstroke	1:06.37	26	Did not advance			
Diana Chang	Girls’ 200m Backstroke	2:21.18	19			Did not advance	

== Table tennis ==
Individual

Athlete	Event	Round 1		Round 2		Quarterfinals	Semifinals	Final	Rank
Athlete	Event	Group Matches	Rank	Group Matches	Rank	Quarterfinals	Semifinals	Final	Rank
Rodrigo Tapia	Boys' singles	Bedair (EGY); L 0–3 (8–11, 5–11, 9–11)	4 qB	Hmam (TUN); L 2–3 (11–3, 3–11, 8–11, 15–13, 9–11)	3	Did not advance			25
Rodrigo Tapia	Boys' singles	Kim (PRK); L 0–3 (9–11, 11–13, 7–11)	4 qB	Saragovi (ARG); W 3–1 (3–11, 11–8, 11–6, 11–8)	3	Did not advance			25
Rodrigo Tapia	Boys' singles	Lakatos (HUN); L 0–3 (7–11, 8–11, 8–11)	4 qB	Jouti (BRA); L 0–3 (4–11, 3–11, 8–11)	3	Did not advance			25

Team

Athlete	Event	Round 1		Round 2	Quarterfinals	Semifinals	Final	Rank
Athlete	Event	Group Matches	Rank	Round 2	Quarterfinals	Semifinals	Final	Rank
Pan American 3 Adielle Rosheuvel (GUY); Rodrigo Tapia (ECU)	Mixed team	Netherlands; Eerland (NED); Hageraats (NED); L 0–3 (0–3, 1–3, 0–3)	4 qB	Europe 6 Galic (SLO); Leitgeb (AUT); L 0–2 (0–3, 0–3)	Did not advance			25
Pan American 3 Adielle Rosheuvel (GUY); Rodrigo Tapia (ECU)	Mixed team	DPR Korea; Kim (PRK); Kim (PRK); L 0–3 (0–3, 0–3, 0–3)	4 qB	Europe 6 Galic (SLO); Leitgeb (AUT); L 0–2 (0–3, 0–3)	Did not advance			25
Pan American 3 Adielle Rosheuvel (GUY); Rodrigo Tapia (ECU)	Mixed team	Intercontinental 1 Gu (CHN); Hmam (TUN); L 1–2 (0–3, 3–1, 0–3)	4 qB	Europe 6 Galic (SLO); Leitgeb (AUT); L 0–2 (0–3, 0–3)	Did not advance			25

== Tennis ==
Singles

Athlete	Event	Round 1	Round 2	Quarterfinals	Semifinals	Final	Rank
Roberto Quiroz	Boys' Singles	Vesely (CZE); L 1–2 (0–6, 6–3, 3–6)	Consolation; Triki (TUN); L 1–2 (6–1, 4–6, [6–10])	Did not advance			
Diego Acosta	Boys' Singles	Morrissey (IRL); L 0–2 (5–7, 1–6)	Consolation; Uchiyama (JPN); W 2–1 (6–3, 4–6, [10–4])	Consolation; Krawietz (GER); W 2–1 (7–5, 2–6, [10–7])	Consolation; Micov (MKD); L 1–2 (7–6, 6–7, [7–10])	Did not advance	

Doubles

Athlete	Event	Round 1	Quarterfinals	Semifinals	Final	Rank
Diego Acosta (ECU); Roberto Quiroz (ECU)	Boys' doubles	Beretta (PER); Gómez (COL); W 2–0 (6–0, 7–6)	Horanský (SVK); Kovalík (SVK); L 0–2 (6–7, 2–6)	Did not advance		

== Triathlon ==
Girls

Triathlete	Event	Swimming	Transit 1	Cycling	Transit 2	Running	Total time	Rank
Jessica Piedra	Individual	10:06	0:35	33:51	0:27	21:40	1:06:39.86	20

Men's

Athlete	Event	Swim (1.5 km)	Trans 1	Bike (40 km)	Trans 2	Run (10 km)	Total	Rank
Juan Andrade	Individual	8:53	0:28	30:06	0:25	17:09	57:01.41	11

Mixed

Athlete	Event	Total Times per Athlete (Swim 250 m, Bike 7 km, Run 1.7 km)	Total Group Time	Rank
Jessica Piedra (ECU); Carlos Perez (VEN); Leslie Amat Alvarez (CUB); Iuri Vinuto (BRA)	Mixed Team Relay; Americas 3	22:30; 19:53; 23:32; 20:39	1:26:34.25	11
Christine Ridenour (CAN); Luis Oliveros (MEX); Andrea Longueira (CHI); Juan Andrade (ECU)	Mixed Team Relay; Americas 2	20:21; 18:47; 23:07; 20:15	1:22:30.15	5

== Weightlifting ==
Athlete	Event	Snatch	Clean & Jerk	Total	Rank
Rene Pizango	Boys' 62kg	103	135	238	6
Veronica Haro	Girls' 58kg	73	93	166	4

== Wrestling ==
Freestyle

Athlete	Event	Pools		Final	Rank
Athlete	Event	Groups	Rank	Final	Rank
Johnny Pilay	Boys' 63kg	Pshnatlov (RUS); L 0–2 (0–3, 0–8)	3	5th place match Boudraa (ALG); W 2–0 (1–0, 3–0)	DQ
Johnny Pilay	Boys' 63kg	Fazlic (AUS); W 2–0 (1–0, 6–0)	3	5th place match Boudraa (ALG); W 2–0 (1–0, 3–0)	DQ
Johnny Pilay	Boys' 63kg	Mosidze (GEO); L 0–2 (2–3, 0–7)	3	5th place match Boudraa (ALG); W 2–0 (1–0, 3–0)	DQ

Greco-Roman

Athlete	Event	Pools		Final	Rank
Athlete	Event	Groups	Rank	Final	Rank
Henry Pilay	Boys' 42kg	Bazarov (AZE); L 0–2 (0–1, 0–3)	3	5th place match Khamseh (IRI); L 1–2 (0–1, 1–0, 0–1)	6
Henry Pilay	Boys' 42kg	Zhabskyy (UKR); L Fall (1–7, 1–3)	3	5th place match Khamseh (IRI); L 1–2 (0–1, 1–0, 0–1)	6
