= Sailing at the 2010 Summer Youth Olympics – Girls' Byte CII =

Girls' Byte CII at the I Summer Youth Olympic Games
- Venue: National Sailing Centre
- Dates: August 17–25, 2010
- Competitors: 32 from 32 nations

Medalists
1st place, gold medalist(s)		Lara Vadlau	Austria
2nd place, silver medalist(s)		Daphne van der Vaart	Netherlands
3rd place, bronze medalist(s)		Constanze Stolz	Germany

Girls' Byte CII class competition at the 2010 Summer Youth Olympics in Singapore took place from August 17 to August 25 at the National Sailing Centre. 32 sailors competed in this dinghy competition.

Sixteen races were scheduled however, due to bad weather conditions, only 11 races plus the Medal race were contested. Only the 9 best results along with the Medal race result were totaled for the final results.

== Medalists ==
Gold	Lara Vadlau; Austria
Silver	Daphne van der Vaart; Netherlands
Bronze	Constanze Stolz; Germany

== Results ==
Race M is the medal race.

Rank	Athlete	Race												Net Points
Rank	Athlete	1	2	3	4	5	6	7	8	9	10	11	M	Net Points
1st place, gold medalist(s)	Lara Vadlau (AUT)	~~5~~	1	~~9~~	1	1	3	4	3	2	5	3	4	27
2nd place, silver medalist(s)	Daphne van der Vaart (NED)	2	5	16	~~21~~	~~RAF~~	5	3	1	1	2	4	2	41
3rd place, bronze medalist(s)	Constanze Stolz (GER)	1	2	2	~~18~~	5	11	2	7	4	~~12~~	2	21	57
4	Céline Carlsen (DEN)	7	9	1	13	2	2	~~14~~	4	~~16~~	9	6	5	58
5	Natasha Michiko Yokoyama (SIN)	6	7	~~23~~	6	4	1	~~20~~	6	20	1	12	3	66
6	Claudia Mazzaferro (BRA)	~~21~~	6	3	3	10	4	12	21	3	~~OCS~~	13	6	81
7	Khairunneeta Mohd Afendy (MAS)	4	11	~~18~~	4	~~15~~	14	8	10	7	8	9	10	85
8	Gu Min (CHN)	10	12	~~19~~	2	17	~~DSQ~~	1	9	9	18	1	9	88
9	Niki Blassar (FIN)	~~23~~	~~20~~	6	16	3	7	5	2	12	17	8	12	88
10	Sarah Douglas (CAN)	13	~~16~~	10	15	16	9	11	11	11	4	~~OCS~~	1	101
11	Elise Beavis (NZL)	11	10	7	~~DSQ~~	9	~~15~~	6	8	15	11	15	11	103
12	Sara Piasecka (POL)	~~DSQ~~	4	13	8	11	8	7	17	~~18~~	6	16	16	106
13	Alexandra Rayroux (SUI)	3	3	17	9	8	6	9	16	~~21~~	~~OCS~~	19	18	108
14	Sofiia Larycheva (UKR)	18	15	4	17	7	17	17	~~OCS~~	~~19~~	7	7	7	116
15	Inês Sobral (POR)	17	8	~~25~~	22	6	10	16	5	5	~~26~~	10	23	122
16	Pinar Kaynar (TUR)	8	13	~~14~~	5	12	13	~~22~~	14	14	14	14	15	122
17	Sophie Murphy (IRL)	14	19	~~24~~	~~20~~	19	12	10	12	8	13	11	8	126
18	Eva Peternelj (SLO)	15	18	8	7	14	16	~~21~~	~~25~~	10	15	21	19	143
19	Madison Kennedy (AUS)	19	14	5	10	13	18	15	19	~~22~~	20	~~24~~	14	147
20	Paloma Esteban (DOM)	~~26~~	17	20	11	18	~~22~~	13	22	13	3	5	28	150
21	Catherine Diaz (ISV)	20	~~24~~	12	12	21	~~26~~	24	13	6	19	18	13	158
22	Maria Poncell-Maurin (CHI)	12	21	11	14	~~DSQ~~	25	~~26~~	15	17	24	17	17	173
23	Stephanie Lovell (LCA)	9	23	~~26~~	24	23	20	23	24	~~28~~	10	22	24	202
24	Sanlay Castro (CUB)	24	22	22	23	25	19	19	18	~~30~~	16	~~28~~	22	210
25	Elizabeth Wauchope (CAY)	22	25	21	25	22	~~27~~	18	20	~~DSQ~~	23	26	20	222
26	Matilde Simoncini (SMR)	16	~~27~~	15	27	20	23	~~31~~	23	26	21	23	DNC	227
27	Nicole van der Velden (ARU)	~~29~~	29	~~31~~	29	24	21	25	26	23	25	25	31	258
28	Irene Abascal (GUA)	27	26	~~DSQ~~	26	28	~~30~~	28	30	27	27	20	25	264
29	Lamia Feriel Hammiche (ALG)	28	28	28	19	~~29~~	28	~~30~~	29	24	29	29	27	269
30	Tu'lemanu Ripley (ASA)	30	~~31~~	27	31	27	29	27	27	25	22	~~OCS~~	26	271
31	Teau Moana McKenzie (COK)	25	~~30~~	29	30	26	~~DSQ~~	29	28	29	28	27	29	280
32	Lara Kiran Granier (KEN)	31	~~32~~	30	28	30	24	~~32~~	31	31	30	30	30	295

=== Notes ===
Scoring abbreviations are defined as follows:

- OCS – On the Course Side of the starting line
- DSQ – Disqualified
- DNF – Did Not Finish
- DNS – Did Not Start
- BFD – Black Flag Disqualification
- RAF – Retired after Finishing
