= Ganbatyn Erdenebold =

Mongolian artistic gymnast (born 1993)

- Full name: Ganbatyn Erdenebold
- Born: May 28, 1993 (age 33)
- Height: 5 ft 2 in (1.57 m)

Gymnastics career
- Discipline: Men's artistic gymnastics
- Country represented: Mongolia
Medal record
Men's artistic gymnastics
Representing Mongolia
Youth Olympic Games
Gold medal – first place	2010 Singapore	Vault
Junior Asian Championships
Silver medal – second place	2010 Chiba	Vault

Ganbat (Ganbatyn) Erdenebold (Mongolian: Ганбатын Эрдэнэболд; born May 28, 1993) is a Mongolian artistic gymnast. He represented Mongolia at the 2010 Summer Youth Olympics where he won an individual gold medal on the vault.

== 2010 Summer Youth Olympics ==
At the 2010 Summer Youth Olympics, Erdeneboldt qualified 37th in the all-around, and did not qualify for the individual all around final. However, in the event finals, he was able to earn a gold medal on vault, a first for Mongolia. He also placed 5th on the still rings.

== Senior Career ==
Ganbatyn Erdenebold attended the 2011 World Artistic Gymnastics Championships in Tokyo, Japan, where he placed 19th on vault with a score of 15.733. In the all-around Ganbatyn finished 123rd with a score of 77.498 points. Ganbatyn also took part in the 2015 World Artistic Gymnastics Championships in Glasgow, UK, where he placed 16th on vault during the qualification round with a score of 14.483, as well as 116th in the all-around with a score of 74.864 points.
