= Athletics at the 2010 Summer Youth Olympics – Boys' pole vault =

Athletics – Boys' pole vault at the I Summer Youth Olympic Games
- Venue: Bishan Stadium
- Date: August 19–23
- Competitors: 16 from 16 nations

Medalists
1st place, gold medalist(s)		Didac Salas	Spain
2nd place, silver medalist(s)		Thiago da Silva	Brazil
3rd place, bronze medalist(s)		Theodoros Chrysanthopoulos	Greece

The boys' pole vault competition at the 2010 Youth Olympic Games was held on 19–23 August 2010 in Bishan Stadium.

== Schedule ==
Date	Time	Round
19 August 2010	09:10	Qualification
23 August 2010	09:05	Final

== Results ==
=== Qualification ===
Rank	Athlete	3.70	3.85	4.00	4.15	4.30	4.45	4.60	4.70	4.80	Result	Notes	Q
1	Wataru Tanaka (JPN)	-	-	-	-	-	-	xxo	-	xo	4.80		FA
2	Theodoros Chrysanthopoulos (GRE)	-	-	-	-	-	o	o	o		4.70	=PB	FA
2	Ivan Horvat (CRO)	-	-	-	-	-	-	o	o		4.70		FA
2	Didac Salas (ESP)	-	-	-	-	-	-	o	o		4.70		FA
2	Melker Svard Jacobsson (SWE)	-	-	-	-	-	-	-	o		4.70		FA
6	Arnaud Art (BEL)	-	-	-	-	-	o	o	xo		4.70		FA
7	Jonas Efferoth (GER)	-	-	-	-	-	-	o	xxo		4.70		FA
8	Thiago da Silva (BRA)	-	-	-	-	-	-	o	xxx		4.60		FA
9	Reese Watson (USA)	-	-	-	-	-	xo	o	xxx		4.60		FB
10	Ondrej Honka (CZE)	-	-	-	-	o	xo	xo	xxx		4.60		FB
11	Umit Sungur (TUR)	-	-	-	-	xxo	o	xo	xxx		4.60		FB
12	Brodie Cross (AUS)	-	-	-	-	-	o	xxx			4.45		FB
13	Migael Celliers (RSA)	-	-	-	-	o	xo	xxx			4.45		FB
14	Hsiao-Wei Chen (TPE)	-	-	-	-	xxo	xo	xxx			4.45		FB
15	Fahme Zazam Mehamed (MAS)	-	-	xxo	-	xxx					4.00		FB
	Abel Thesee (MRI)	xxx									NM		

=== Finals ===
==== Final B ====
Rank	Athlete	3.70	3.85	4.00	4.10	4.20	4.30	4.40	4.50	4.60	4.70	Result	Notes
1	Migael Celliers (RSA)	-	-	-	-	-	o	-	xo	xxo	xxx	4.60	PB
2	Reese Watson (USA)	-	-	-	-	-	-	xo	o	xxx		4.50	
3	Brodie Cross (AUS)	-	-	-	-	-	xo	o	xo	xxx		4.50	
4	Ondrej Honka (CZE)	-	-	-	-	-	o	-	xxx			4.30	
5	Fahme Zazam Mehamed (MAS)	-	-	xo	-	o	-	xxx				4.20	
6	Hsiao-Wei Chen (TPE)	-	-	-	-	xo	-	xxx				4.20	
	Umit Sungur (TUR)	-	-	-	-	-	xxx					NM	
	Abel Thesee (MRI)	xxx										NM	

==== Final A ====
Rank	Athlete	4.40	4.55	4.70	4.85	4.95	5.05	5.15	Result	Notes
1st place, gold medalist(s)	Didac Salas (ESP)	-	-	o	o	o	xo	xxx	5.05	PB
2nd place, silver medalist(s)	Thiago da Silva (BRA)	-	o	xo	o	o	xo	xxx	5.05	PB
3rd place, bronze medalist(s)	Theodoros Chrysanthopoulos (GRE)	-	o	o	o	o	xx-	x	4.95	PB
4	Jonas Efferoth (GER)	-	-	o	o	xxx			4.85	
4	Melker Svard Jacobsson (SWE)	-	-	-	o	xxx			4.85	
6	Arnaud Art (BEL)	-	-	xo	xo	xxx			4.85	
7	Wataru Tanaka (JPN)	-	-	o	xxx				4.70	
8	Ivan Horvat (CRO)	-	-	xxo	xxx				4.70	
