= American Samoa at the 2010 Summer Youth Olympics =

- IOC code: ASA
- NOC: American Samoa National Olympic Committee

in Singapore
- Competitors: 4 in 4 sports
- Flag bearer: Tu'iemanu Ripley
- Medals: Gold 0 Silver 0 Bronze 0 Total 0

Summer Youth Olympics appearances
- 2010; 2014; 2018

American Samoa participated in the 2010 Summer Youth Olympics.

The American Samoan squad consisted of 4 athletes competing in 4 sports: aquatics (swimming), sailing, weightlifting and wrestling.

== Sailing ==
Girls

Athlete	Event	Race												Net Points	Final Rank
Athlete	Event	1	2	3	4	5	6	7	8	9	10	11	M*	Net Points	Final Rank
Tu'Iemanu Ripley	Girls' Byte CII	30	~~31~~	27	31	27	29	27	27	25	22	~~OSC~~	26	271	30

== Swimming ==
Boys

Athletes	Event	Heat		Final	
Athletes	Event	Time	Position	Time	Position
Benjamin Gabbard	200m freestyle	DNS		Did not advance	
Benjamin Gabbard	200m butterfly	DNS		Did not advance	

== Weightlifting ==
Boys

Athlete	Event	Snatch	Clean & Jerk	Total	Rank
Saumaleato Fa'agu	85kg	95	115	210	7

== Wrestling ==
Freestyle

Athlete	Event	Pools		Final	Rank
Athlete	Event	Groups	Rank	Final	Rank
Manuolefoaga Sualevai	Boys' 100kg	Magomedabirov (AZE); L Fall (0–2)	4	7th Place Match; Schutte (RSA); L 0–2 (0–2, 0–4)	8
Manuolefoaga Sualevai	Boys' 100kg	Petriashvili (GEO); L T. Fall (0–6, 0–5)	4	7th Place Match; Schutte (RSA); L 0–2 (0–2, 0–4)	8
Manuolefoaga Sualevai	Boys' 100kg	Enkhtugs (MGL); L Fall (0–4)	4	7th Place Match; Schutte (RSA); L 0–2 (0–2, 0–4)	8
