= Boxing at the 2010 Summer Youth Olympics – Men's 48 kg =

Boxing competitions

These are the results of the Men's Light Fly 48 kg competition in boxing at the 2010 Summer Youth Olympics in Singapore. Preliminaries were held on August 21 at 14:02, semifinals on August 22, at 14:00, 5th place bout on August 23, at 18:00, the bronze medal bout on August 24, at 18:00 and the Final bout on August 25, at 14:00. Unlike world championships and the Olympic Games, only one bronze medal is awarded.

== Medalists ==
Ryan Burnett
Ireland
Salman Alizade
Azerbaijan
Zohidjon Hoorboyev
Uzbekistan

== Results ==
Preliminaries
Ryan Burnett (IRL)	12
Vadzim Kirylenka (BLR)	0
Haziza Matusi (RWA)	1
Zohidjon Hoorboyev (UZB)	7

Semifinals
Mohd Hamid (SIN)	1
Salman Alizade (AZE)	9
Ryan Burnett (IRL)	2
Zohidjon Hoorboyev (UZB)	1

Final
Salman Alizade (AZE)	6
Ryan Burnett (IRL)	13
Third place
Mohd Hamid (SIN)	0
Zohidjon Hoorboyev (UZB)	7

5th place bout
Vadzim Kirylenka (BLR)	WO
Haziza Matusi (RWA)
