= Taekwondo at the 2010 Summer Youth Olympics – Boys' 73 kg =

Taekwondo competition

The boys' 73 kg competition in taekwondo at the 2010 Summer Youth Olympics in Singapore took place on August 18. A total of 10 men competed in this event, limited to fighters whose body weight was less than 73 kilograms. Preliminaries started at 14:16, quarterfinals started at 15:54, semifinals at 19:02 and the final at 20:09. Two bronze medals were awarded at the Taekwondo competitions.

== Medalists ==
Gold	Jin Hak Kim; South Korea
Silver	Aliaskhab Sirazhov; Russia
Bronze	Maksym Dominishyn; Ukraine
Bronze	Michel Samaha; Lebanon

== Results ==
Legend

- PTG — Won by Points Gap
- SUP — Won by Superiority
- OT — Won on over time (Golden Point)

=== Main bracket ===
First round
Tahir Gulec (GER)	12
Christopher Deleage (MON)	2
Tosh van Dijk (SUR)	7
Sabuhi Ismayilzada (AZE)	6

Quarterfinals
Maksym Dominishyn (UKR)	12
Tahir Gulec (GER)	8
Jin Hak Kim (KOR)	12
Jia Zhe Christopher Lee (SIN)	1
Vilson Lajčaj (MNE)	1
Aliaskhab Sirazhov (RUS)	10
Tosh van Dijk (SUR)	4
Michel Samaha (LIB)	5

Semifinals
Maksym Dominishyn (UKR)	4
Jin Hak Kim (KOR)	6
Aliaskhab Sirazhov (RUS)	10
Michel Samaha (LIB)	4

Final
Jin Hak Kim (KOR)	6
Aliaskhab Sirazhov (RUS)	4
