= Lebanon at the 2010 Summer Youth Olympics =

- IOC code: LIB
- NOC: Lebanese Olympic Committee
- Website: www.lebolymp.org

in Singapore
- Competitors: 5 in 4 sports
- Flag bearer: Michel Samaha
- Medals Ranked 84th: Gold 0 Silver 0 Bronze 1 Total 1

Summer Youth Olympics appearances
- 2010; 2014; 2018

Lebanon participated in the 2010 Summer Youth Olympics in Singapore.

== Medalists ==
Medal	Name	Sport	Event	Date
Bronze	Michel Samaha	Taekwondo	Men's 73kg	18 Aug

== Fencing ==
Group Stage

Athlete	Event	Match 1	Match 2	Match 3	Match 4	Match 5	Match 6	Seed
Rita Abou Jaoude	Girls’ Foil	Goldie (CAN); L 1-5	Alekseeva (RUS); L 0-5	Shaito (USA); L 0-5	Daw (EGY); L 1-5	Ndao (SEN); W 5-3	Mancini (ITA); L 2-5	12

Knock-Out Stage

Athlete	Event	Round of 16	Quarterfinals	Semifinals	Final	Rank
Rita Abou Jaoude	Girls’ Foil	Mancini (ITA); L 7-15	did not advance			12

== Judo ==
Individual

Athlete	Event	Round 1	Round 2	Round 3	Round 4	Semifinals	Final	Rank
Athlete	Event	Opposition Result	Opposition Result	Opposition Result	Opposition Result	Opposition Result	Opposition Result	Rank
Caren Chammas	Girls' -63 kg	BYE	Matniyazova (UZB); L 000-101	Repechage; Baxter (NZL); W 100-000	Repechage; Beridze (GEO); W 100-000	Repechage; Matniyazova (UZB); L 000-001	Did not advance	7

Team

Team	Event	Round 1	Round 2	Semifinals	Final	Rank
Team	Event	Opposition Result	Opposition Result	Opposition Result	Opposition Result	Rank
Munich; Vita Valnova (BLR); Kęstutis Vitkauskas (LTU); Un Ju Ri (PRK); Beka Tugushi (GEO); Jalil Jalilov (AZE); Caren Chammas (LIB); Yacov Mamistvalov (ISR)	Mixed Team	Essen; L 3-4	did not advance			9

== Swimming ==
Athletes	Event	Heat		Semifinal		Final	
Athletes	Event	Time	Position	Time	Position	Time	Position
Abbas Raad	Boys’ 50m Freestyle	25.26	30	Did not advance			
Abbas Raad	Boys’ 50m Backstroke			28.76	13	Did not advance	
Nibal Yamout	Girls’ 200m Breaststroke	2:46.96	19			Did not advance	
Nibal Yamout	Girls’ 200m Individual Medley	2:32.23	23			Did not advance	

== Taekwondo ==
Michel Samaha qualified for the 2010 Youth Olympic Games by getting 5th place at the World qualifications in Tijuana, Mexico.

Samaha defeated the player from Suriname that had won against the player from Azerbaijan (ranked 6th at the World Qualifications). Samaha reached the semi-final and secured the BRONZE medal then lost against the player from Russia.

Samaha brought back to Lebanon the 1st Olympic medal since 1980.

Athlete	Event	Preliminary	Quarterfinal	Semifinal	Final	Rank
Michel Samaha	Boys' -73kg	BYE	Tosh van Dijk (SUR); W 5-4	Aliaskhab Sirazhov (RUS); L 4-10	did not advance	Bronze medal
