= Guinea-Bissau at the 2010 Summer Youth Olympics =

- IOC code: GBS
- NOC: Guinea-Bissau Olympic Committee
- Website: cogb.gw

in Singapore
- Competitors: 4 in 3 sports
- Flag bearer: None

Summer Youth Olympics appearances
- 2010; 2014; 2018

Guinea-Bissau competed at the 2010 Summer Youth Olympics, the inaugural Youth Olympic Games, held in Singapore from 14 August to 26 August 2010.

== Athletics ==
=== Boys ===
Track and Road Events

Athletes	Event	Qualification		Final	
Athletes	Event	Result	Rank	Result	Rank
Adelino Anco Nanjola	Boys’ 100m	12.62	35 qE	12.67	32

=== Girls ===
Track and Road Events

Athletes	Event	Qualification		Final	
Athletes	Event	Result	Rank	Result	Rank
Chalita Lopes	Girls’ 100m	15.26	35 qE	15.03	33

== Canoeing ==
Girls

Athlete	Event	Time Trial		Round 1	Round 2 (Rep)	Round 3	Round 4	Round 5	Final
Athlete	Event	Time	Rank	Round 1	Round 2 (Rep)	Round 3	Round 4	Round 5	Final
Beatriz Soares da Gama	Girls’ K1 Sprint	DNS		did not advance					

== Wrestling ==
Freestyle

Athlete	Event	Pools		Final	Rank
Athlete	Event	Groups	Rank	Final	Rank
Amadeus Pereira	Boys' 63kg	Kadirov (TJK); L 0–2 (0–4, 0–3)	4	7th Place Match; Fazlic (AUS); W 2–0 (5–2, 6–3)	7
Amadeus Pereira	Boys' 63kg	Murphy (USA); L Fall (0–4)	4	7th Place Match; Fazlic (AUS); W 2–0 (5–2, 6–3)	7
Amadeus Pereira	Boys' 63kg	Boudraa (ALG); L 1–2 (3–5, 7–0, 1-1+)	4	7th Place Match; Fazlic (AUS); W 2–0 (5–2, 6–3)	7
