= Athletics at the 2010 Summer Youth Olympics – Boys' long jump =

Athletics – Boys' long jump at the I Summer Youth Olympic Games
- Venue: Bishan Stadium
- Date: August 18–22
- Competitors: 15 from 15 nations

Medalists
1st place, gold medalist(s)		Caio Cézar dos Santos	Brazil
2nd place, silver medalist(s)		Sho Matsubara	Japan
3rd place, bronze medalist(s)		Rudolph Pienaar	South Africa

The boys' long jump competition at the 2010 Youth Olympic Games was held on 18–22 August 2010 in Bishan Stadium.

== Schedule ==
Date	Time	Round
18 August 2010	10:10	Qualification
22 August 2010	10:00	Final

== Results ==
=== Qualification ===
Rank	Athlete	1	2	3	4	Result	Notes	Q
1	Caio Cézar dos Santos (BRA)	x	7.66	–	–	7.66		FA
2	Andreas Trajkovski (DEN)	x	7.50	7.35	7.56	7.56	PB	FA
3	Huang Haibing (CHN)	7.28	7.39	x	7.51	7.51		FA
4	Sho Matsubara (JPN)	6.90	7.15	7.39	7.51	7.51	PB	FA
5	Yunier Duran Llamo (CUB)	7.12	7.10	7.31	6.73	7.31		FA
6	Rudolph Pienaar (RSA)	7.20	7.28	7.16	7.16	7.28		FA
7	Sergey Morgunov (RUS)	7.21	7.27	x	7.26	7.27		FA
8	Toros Pilikoglu (TUR)	7.19	6.85	x	7.12	7.19		FA
9	Kurt Jenner (AUS)	x	7.10	x	6.00	7.10		FB
10	Juan Mosquera (PAN)	6.37	6.94	7.04	6.87	7.04		FB
11	Vadym Adamchuk (UKR)	x	x	6.85	7.02	7.02		FB
12	Riccardo Pagan (ITA)	7.00	6.92	6.95	6.96	7.00		FB
13	Leandro Monje Cerino (ARG)	6.81	–	–	–	6.81		FB
14	Abiola Olajide (NGR)	6.78	6.70	x	6.55	6.78		FB
15	Haein Jung (KOR)	6.72	x	x	x	6.72		FB

=== Finals ===
==== Final B ====
Rank	Athlete	1	2	3	4	Result	Notes
1	Vadym Adamchuk (UKR)	6.66	7.12	6.90	x	7.12	
2	Kurt Jenner (AUS)	6.80	x	7.08	x	7.08	
3	Abiola Olajide (NGR)	x	7.03	6.65	x	7.03	
4	Haein Jung (KOR)	x	6.81	6.46	x	6.81	
5	Juan Mosquera (PAN)	4.37	–	–	–	4.37	
	Leandro Monje Cerino (ARG)					DNS	
	Riccardo Pagan (ITA)					DNS	

==== Final A ====
Rank	Athlete	1	2	3	4	Result	Notes
1st place, gold medalist(s)	Caio Cézar dos Santos (BRA)	x	x	7.58	7.69	7.69	
2nd place, silver medalist(s)	Sho Matsubara (JPN)	7.11	7.41	7.50	7.65	7.65	PB
3rd place, bronze medalist(s)	Rudolph Pienaar (RSA)	7.44	7.46	7.53	7.45	7.53	PB
4	Yunier Duran Llamo (CUB)	7.41	7.27	6.90	7.31	7.41	
5	Andreas Trajkovski (DEN)	7.18	x	7.33	x	7.33	
6	Toros Pilikoglu (TUR)	x	6.78	6.95	7.29	7.29	
7	Sergey Morgunov (RUS)	6.92	7.08	6.88	7.07	7.08	
8	Huang Haibing (CHN)	x	6.79	6.85	x	6.85	
