= Suriname at the 2010 Summer Youth Olympics =

- IOC code: SUR
- NOC: Suriname Olympic Committee

in Singapore
- Competitors: 5 in 4 sports
- Flag bearer: Tosh van Dijk

Summer Youth Olympics appearances
- 2010; 2014; 2018

Suriname competed at the 2010 Summer Youth Olympics, the inaugural Youth Olympic Games, held in Singapore from 14 August to 26 August 2010.

== Athletics ==
=== Girls ===
Track and Road Events

Athletes	Event	Qualification		Final	
Athletes	Event	Result	Rank	Result	Rank
Ramona Van Der Vloot	Girls’ 100m	12.14	9 qB	12.15	10

== Badminton ==
Boys

Athlete	Event	Group Stage				Knock-Out Stage			
Athlete	Event	Match 1	Match 2	Match 3	Rank	Quarterfinal	Semifinal	Final	Rank
Irfan Djabar	Boys’ Singles	Pan (CAN) L 1-2 (21-12, 21-23, 16-21)	Sukamta (INA) L 0-2 (4-21, 10-21)	Horiuchi (JPN) L 0-2 (11-21, 15-21)	4	Did not advance			

== Swimming ==
Athletes	Event	Heat		Semifinal		Final	
Athletes	Event	Time	Position	Time	Position	Time	Position
Chinyere Pigot	Girls’ 50m Freestyle	27.00	14 Q	26.69	13	Did not advance	
Chinyere Pigot	Girls’ 100m Freestyle	58.66	19	Did not advance			
Karlene van der Jagt	Girls’ 400m Freestyle	4:45.03	26			Did not advance	
Karlene van der Jagt	Girls’ 200m Butterfly	2:37.17	23			Did not advance	

== Taekwondo ==
Athlete	Event	Preliminary	Quarterfinal	Semifinal	Final	Rank
Tosh van Dijk	Boys' -73kg	Sabuhi Ismayilzada (AZE); W 7-6	Michel Samaha (LIB); L 4-5	did not advance		5
