= Weightlifting at the 2010 Summer Youth Olympics – Boys' 69 kg =

The boys' 69 kg weightlifting event was the third men's event at the weightlifting competition at the 2010 Summer Youth Olympics, with competitors limited to a maximum of 69 kilograms of body mass. The whole competition took place on August 16 at 18:00.

Each lifter performed in both the snatch and clean and jerk lifts, with the final score being the sum of the lifter's best result in each. The athlete received three attempts in each of the two lifts; the score for the lift was the heaviest weight successfully lifted.

== Medalists ==
Gold	Nijat Rahimov; Azerbaijan	295 kg
Silver	Gong Xingbin; China	293 kg
Bronze	Ediel Marquez Ona; Cuba	283 kg

== Results ==
Rank	Name	Group	Body Weight	Snatch (kg)				Clean & Jerk (kg)				Total (kg)
Rank	Name	Group	Body Weight	1	2	3	Res	1	2	3	Res	Total (kg)
1st place, gold medalist(s)	Nijat Rahimov (AZE)	A	68.76	125	130	134	134	154	161	~~166~~	161	295
2nd place, silver medalist(s)	Gong Xingbin (CHN)	A	68.37	128	133	~~135~~	133	160	~~165~~	~~165~~	160	293
3rd place, bronze medalist(s)	Ediel Marquez Ona (CUB)	A	66.75	120	125	129	129	145	150	154	154	283
4	Ziyobitddin Kutbitddinov (UZB)	A	68.82	122	126	~~128~~	126	147	~~154~~	~~158~~	147	273
5	Tairat Bunsuk (THA)	A	68.51	115	~~119~~	119	119	145	150	~~160~~	150	269
6	Housseyn Fardjallah (ALG)	A	68.64	110	115	~~119~~	115	140	~~145~~	~~145~~	140	255
7	Mohsen Ghazalian (IRI)	A	66.08	110	115	118	118	~~135~~	135	~~140~~	135	253
8	Maraj Tubal (LBA)	A	65.78	100	110	~~113~~	110	~~130~~	~~130~~	130	130	240
9	Joshua Milne (NZL)	A	68.50	83	89	91	91	110	~~117~~	~~117~~	110	201
10	Charlie Lolohea (FIJ)	A	67.96	72	~~78~~	78	78	95	100	105	105	183
	Nico Müller (GER)	A	68.77	118	122	125	125	~~148~~	~~150~~	~~150~~	—	—
