= Elman Mukhtarov =

Azerbaijani wrestler (born 1994)

Personal information
- Born: December 12, 1994 (age 31) Qaradağlı, Goranboy Rayon, Azerbaijan
- Height: 1.63 m (5 ft 4 in)
- Weight: 67 kg (148 lb)

Sport
- Country: Azerbaijan
- Sport: Wrestling
- Event: Greco-Roman
Medal record
European Games
| Bronze medal – third place | 2015 Baku | 59 kg |
Youth Olympic Games
| Gold medal – first place | 2010 Singapore | 50 kg |
World Cup
| Gold medal – first place | 2015 Tehran | Team |

Elman Mukhtarov (Azerbaijani: Elman Muxtarov; born December 12, 1994) is an Azerbaijani wrestler who participated at the 2010 Summer Youth Olympics in Singapore. He won the gold medal for Azerbaijan in the boys' Greco-Roman 50 kg event, defeating Nurbek Hakkulov of Uzbekistan in the final. He competed in the 2019 World Championship but was eliminated in the second round by Armenia's Slavik Galstyan.
