= Wrestling at the 2010 Summer Youth Olympics =

Wrestling at the I Summer Youth Olympic Games
- Venue: Suntec Singapore Convention and Exhibition Centre
- Dates: 15 – 17 August 2010
- No. of events: 11 (6 boys, 5 girls)

The wrestling competition at the 2010 Summer Youth Olympics took place in Singapore from 15 to 17 August at the International Convention Centre. The first positive drugs tests of the Games came in wrestling events, with the International Olympic Committee announcing on 15 October that two wrestlers, including a silver medallist, had tested positive for furosemide.

== Event summary ==
=== Medal table ===
Rank	Nation	Gold	Silver	Bronze	Total
1	Azerbaijan	4	1	0	5
2	Russia	3	0	2	5
3	Japan	2	0	0	2
4	Turkey	1	1	1	3
5	Kazakhstan	1	0	1	2
5	Kyrgyzstan	1	0	1	2
7	Canada	1	0	0	1
7	Mongolia	1	0	0	1
9	Cuba	0	2	0	2
10	India	0	1	1	2
10	Iran	0	1	1	2
10	Ukraine	0	1	1	2
13	China	0	1	0	1
13	Egypt	0	1	0	1
13	Moldova	0	1	0	1
13	South Korea	0	1	0	1
13	Tajikistan	0	1	0	1
13	United States	0	1	0	1
19	Uzbekistan	0	0	3	3
20	Armenia	0	0	1	1
20	Finland	0	0	1	1
20	Georgia	0	0	1	1
Totals (22 entries)		14	13	14	41

== Girl's events ==
=== Freestyle ===
Event	Gold	Silver	Bronze
46 kg	Yu Miyahara; Japan	Lulia Leorda; Moldova	Petra Olli; Finland
52 kg	Patimat Bagomedova; Azerbaijan	Yuan Yuan; China	Nilufar Gadaeva; Uzbekistan
60 kg	Baatarzorigyn Battsetseg; Mongolia	Pooja Dhanda; India	Svetlana Lipatova; Russia
70 kg	Dorothy Yeats; Canada	Moon Jin-ju; South Korea	Karyna Stankova; Ukraine

== Boy's events ==
=== Freestyle ===
Event	Gold	Silver	Bronze
46 kg	Aldar Balzhinimaev; Russia	Mehran Sheikhi; Iran	Artak Hovhannisyan; Armenia
54 kg	Yuki Takahashi; Japan	Kanan Guluyev; Azerbaijan	Mehmet Ali Daylak; Turkey
63 kg	Azamatbi Pshnatlov; Russia	Bakhodur Kadarov; Tajikistan	Irakli Mosidze; Georgia
76 kg	Rasul Kalayci; Turkey	Jordan Rogers; United States	Dierbek Ergashev; Uzbekistan
100 kg	Ali Magomedabirov; Azerbaijan	Abraham Conyedo; Cuba	Satyawart Kadian; India

=== Greco-Roman ===
Event	Gold	Silver	Bronze
42 kg	Murad Bazarov; Azerbaijan	Yosvanys Peña; Cuba	Akan Baimaganbetov; Kazakhstan
50 kg	Elman Mukhtarov; Azerbaijan	Vacant^{[A]}	Shadybek Sulaimanov; Kyrgyzstan
58 kg	Urmatbek Amatov; Kyrgyzstan	Olexandr Lytvynov; Ukraine	Artur Suleymanov; Russia
69 kg	Zhanlbek Kandybayev; Kazakhstan	Musa Gedik; Turkey	Yousef Ghaderian; Iran
85 kg	Ruslan Adzhigov; Russia	Hamdy Abdelwahab; Egypt	Ruslan Kamilov; Uzbekistan

== Changes in medal winners ==
^[A] On 15 October 2010, the International Olympic Committee announced that Nurbek Hakkulov, who won a silver medal for Uzbekistan in wrestling, and Johnny Pilay who finished fifth in a separate wrestling event for Ecuador, had tested positive for a banned diuretic, furosemide. Both were disqualified and Hakkulov was stripped of his silver medal, although no decision was taken on whether to promote Shadybek Sulaimanov and Johan Rodriguez Banguela in the event.
