= Tevfik Burak Babaoğlu =

Turkish fencer (born 1993)

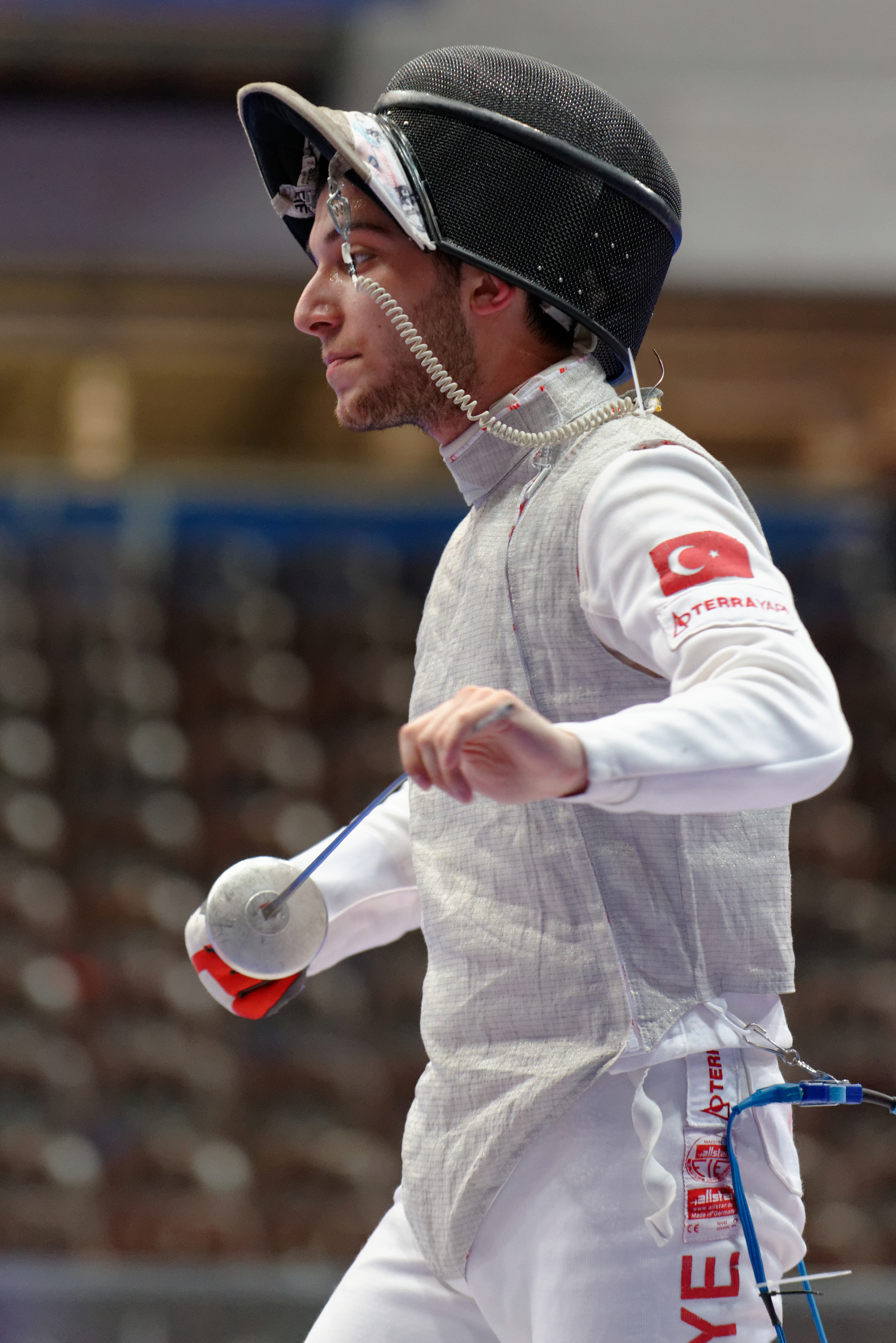
- Babaoğlu at the 2013 World Fencing Championships

Personal information
- Full name: Tevfik Burak Babaoğlu
- Nationality: Turkish
- Born: Tevfik Burak; 11 May 1993 (age 33) Istanbul, Turkey
- Home town: Istanbul, Turkey
- Height: 1.80 m (5 ft 11 in)
- Weight: 80 kg (176 lb)

Fencing career
- Sport: Fencing
- Country: Turkey
- Weapon: foil
- Hand: right-handed
- National coach: Damir Sayfutdinov
- Club: HASAL Spor Klübü
- Head coach: Damir Sayfutdinov
- Former coach: Constantin Manta
- FIE ranking: current ranking

Tevfik Burak Babaoğlu (born 11 May 1993) is a Turkish foil fencer.

He started fencing at the age of 11. He represented Turkey as a cadet, junior and senior fencer since the age of 15. In 2008, he was the winner of Marathon Fleuret 2008 in Paris. As a cadet fencer, he won two European Cadet Circuit Competitions in Halle and Bratislava. He completed 1st the European Cadet Men's Foil Ranking at the end of the season 2010. He finished fourth at the cadet event of the 2010 Summer Youth Olympics and reached the quarter-finals at the 2013 Junior World Championships in Poreč (6th) and at the 2014 U23 European Championships in Tbilisi (7th). In the senior category, he qualified for the final table of 64 of the World Championships in 2009, 2010, and 2013.
