= Salman Alizade =

Azerbaijani boxer (born 1993)

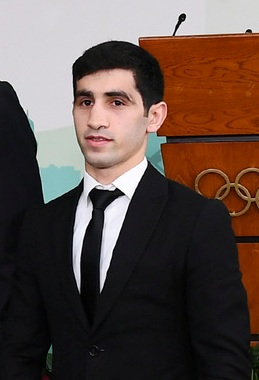

Personal information
- Born: December 1, 1993 (age 32) Baku, Azerbaijan
- Height: 1.61 m (5 ft 3 1/2 in)

Sport
- Country: Azerbaijan
- Sport: Boxing
- Event: Light flyweight
Medal record
European Amateur Championships
Gold medal – first place	2011 Ankara	Light flyweight
Bronze medal – third place	2013 Minsk	Light flyweight
Youth Olympic Games
Silver medal – second place	2010 Singapore	Light flyweight
AIBA Youth World Boxing Championships
Gold medal – first place	2010 Baku	Light flyweight

Salman Alizade (born 1 December 1993) is an amateur Light flyweight boxer from Azerbaijan.

He who won silver at the 2010 Summer Youth Olympics, and gold at the 2011 European Amateur Boxing Championships.

At the 2013 European Amateur Boxing Championships Alizade won a bronze medal.
