= Nurbek Hakkulov =

Uzbekistani wrestler

Sport
- Country: Uzbekistan
- Sport: Greco-Roman wrestling

Nurbek Hakkulov is an Uzbek Greco-Roman wrestler who participated at the 2010 Summer Youth Olympics in Singapore. He finished in the silver medal position in the 50 kg weight class, losing to Elman Mukhtarov of Azerbaijan in the final. However, on 15 October 2010, the International Olympic Committee announced that Hakkulov had failed a drugs test for furosemide and had been stripped of his silver medal and disqualified.
