= Irakli Mosidze =

Georgian wrestler

Medal record

Representing Georgia

Men's wrestling

Youth Olympic Games
| Bronze medal – third place | 2010 Singapore | 63 kg |

Irakli Mosidze is a Georgian wrestler who participated at the 2010 Summer Youth Olympics in Singapore. He won the bronze medal in the boys' freestyle 63 kg event, defeating Murphy Quinton of the United States in the bronze medal match.
