= Azamatbi Pshnatlov =

Russian wrestler

Medal record

Representing Russia

Men's wrestling

Youth Olympic Games
Gold medal – first place	2010 Singapore	63 kg

Azamatbi Arsenovich Pshnatlov (Russian: Азаматби Арсенович Пшнатлов; born 9 June 1994) is a Russian wrestler who participated at the 2010 Summer Youth Olympics in Singapore. He won the gold medal in the boys' freestyle 63 kg event, defeating Bakhodur Kadarov of Tajikistan in the final.
