= Mehmet Ali Daylak =

Turkish wrestler

Medal record

Representing Turkey

Men's wrestling

World University Championship
Bronze medal – third place	2018 Goiana	61 kg

Youth Olympic Games
Bronze medal – third place	2010 Singapore	54 kg

Mehmet Ali Daylak is a Turkish wrestler who participated at the 2010 Summer Youth Olympics in Singapore. He won the bronze medal in the boys' freestyle 54 kg event, defeating Yerzon Hernandez of Colombia in the bronze medal match.
