= Maher Ghanmi =

Tunisian freestyle wrestler (born 1994)

Personal information
- Born: 7 July 1994 (age 32)

Sport
- Country: Tunisia
- Sport: Amateur wrestling
- Event: Freestyle
Medal record
Men's freestyle wrestling
Representing Tunisia
African Games
Bronze medal – third place	2019 Rabat	74 kg
African Championships
Gold medal – first place	2016 Alexandria	70 kg
Silver medal – second place	2017 Marrakesh	70 kg
Silver medal – second place	2019 Hammamet	74 kg
Bronze medal – third place	2014 Tunis	65 kg
Bronze medal – third place	2020 Algiers	74 kg

Maher Ghanmi (born 7 July 1994) is a Tunisian freestyle wrestler. He is a bronze medalist at the African Games and a five-time medalist at the African Wrestling Championships.

He represented Tunisia at the 2019 African Games held in Rabat, Morocco and he won one of the bronze medals in the men's freestyle 74 kg event.

In 2021, he competed at the African & Oceania Olympic Qualification Tournament hoping to qualify for the 2020 Summer Olympics in Tokyo, Japan. He did not qualify at this tournament and he also failed to qualify for the Olympics at the World Olympic Qualification Tournament held in Sofia, Bulgaria.
