= France at the 2010 Summer Youth Olympics =

- IOC code: FRA
- NOC: French Olympic Committee
- Website: franceolympique.com

in Singapore
- Competitors: 60 in 18 sports
- Flag bearer: Sokhna Galle
- Medals Ranked 9th: Gold 6 Silver 2 Bronze 7 Total 15

Summer Youth Olympics appearances
- 2010; 2014; 2018; 2026

France competed at the 2010 Summer Youth Olympics, the inaugural Youth Olympic Games, held in Singapore from 14 August to 26 August 2010.

The French squad consisted of 60 athletes competing in 18 sports: aquatics (diving, swimming), archery, athletics, badminton, basketball, boxing, canoeing, fencing, gymnastics, handball, judo, modern pentathlon, rowing, sailing, shooting, table tennis, taekwondo and triathlon.

== Medalists ==
| Medal | Name | Sport | Event | Date |
|---|---|---|---|---|
| Gold | Mathilde Cini | Swimming | Youth Women's 200m Backstroke | 19 Aug |
| Gold | Medhy Metella | Swimming | Youth Men's 100m Freestyle | 20 Aug |
| Gold | Anna Santamans | Swimming | Youth Women's 50m Freestyle | 20 Aug |
| Gold | Aurélie Chaboudez | Athletics | Girls' 400m Hurdles | 23 Aug |
| Gold | Alexia Sedykh | Athletics | Girls' hammer throw | 23 Aug |
| Gold | Tony Yoka | Boxing | Men's Super Heavy +91kg | 25 Aug |
| Silver | Ganesh Pedurand; Thomas Rabeisen; Jordan Coelho; Mehdy Metella | Swimming | Youth Men's 4 × 100 m Medley Relay | 18 Aug |
| Silver | Sokhna Gallé | Athletics | Girls' Triple jump | 23 Aug |
| Bronze | Anna Santamans | Swimming | Youth Women's 50m Butterfly | 18 Aug |
| Bronze | Noemie Kober | Rowing | Junior Women's Single Sculls | 18 Aug |
| Bronze | Medhy Metella; Anna Santamans; Mathilde CIni; Jordan Coelho | Swimming | Youth Men's 4 × 100 m Medley Relay | 18 Aug |
| Bronze | Samantha Silvestri | Taekwondo | Women's 63kg | 18 Aug |
| Bronze | Faiza Taoussara | Taekwondo | Women's +63kg | 19 Aug |
| Bronze | Simon Gauzy | Table tennis | Men's singles | 23 Aug |
| Bronze | Adrien Ballet Kebengue; Benjamin Bataille; Jordan Bonilauri; Théophile Causse; Théo Derot; Hugo Descat; Julian Emonet; Antoine Gutfreund; Bryan Jabea Njo; Laurent Lagier Pitre; Mathieu Merceron; Timothey N'Guessan; O'Brian Nyateu; Kévin Rondel | Handball | Men's tournament | 25 Aug |

== Archery ==
Boys

| Athlete | Event | Ranking Round | | Round of 32 | Round of 16 | Quarterfinals | Semifinals | Final | |
| Athlete | Event | Score | Seed | Opposition Score | Opposition Score | Opposition Score | Opposition Score | Opposition Score | Rank |
|---|---|---|---|---|---|---|---|---|---|
| Julien Rossignol | Boys' Individual | 606 | 19 | Jaffar (SIN); L 1-7 | Did not advance | | | | 17 |

Girls

| Athlete | Event | Ranking Round | | Round of 32 | Round of 16 | Quarterfinals | Semifinals | Final | |
| Athlete | Event | Score | Seed | Opposition Score | Opposition Score | Opposition Score | Opposition Score | Opposition Score | Rank |
|---|---|---|---|---|---|---|---|---|---|
| Laurie Lecointre | Girls' Individual | 592 | 17 | Custers (NED); L 0-6 | Did not advance | | | | 17 |

Mixed Team

| Athlete | Event | Partner | Round of 32 | Round of 16 | Quarterfinals | Semifinals | Final | |
| Athlete | Event | Partner | Opposition Score | Opposition Score | Opposition Score | Opposition Score | Opposition Score | Rank |
|---|---|---|---|---|---|---|---|---|
| Julien Rossignol | Mixed Team | Nynne Holdt-Caspersen (DEN) | Tan (TPE)/ Harikul (THA); W 6-4 | Unsal (TUR)/ Jaffar (SIN); L 2-6 | Did not advance | | | 9 |
| Laurie Lecointre | Mixed Team | Axel Müller (SUI) | Sorsa (FIN)/ Tsybzhitnov (RUS); L 4-6 | Did not advance | | | | 17 |

== Athletics ==
=== Boys ===
Track and Road Events

| Athletes | Event | Qualification | | Final | |
| Athletes | Event | Result | Rank | Result | Rank |
|---|---|---|---|---|---|
| Guy-Elphege Anouman | Boys' 200m | 21.95 | 9 qB | DNS | |
| Nicolas Borome | Boys' 110m Hurdles | 13.65 | 3 Q | DNF | |

=== Girls ===
Track and Road Events

| Athletes | Event | Qualification | | Final | |
| Athletes | Event | Result | Rank | Result | Rank |
|---|---|---|---|---|---|
| Coralie Leturgez | Girls' 200m | 25.22 | 12 qB | 25.05 | 12 |
| Aurélie Chaboudez | Girls' 400m Hurdles | 59.26 | 1 Q | 58.41 | Gold medal |
| Nina Habold | Girls' 2000m Steeplechase | 7:05.25 | 9 qB | 6:51.05 | 8 |

Field Events

| Athletes | Event | Qualification | | Final | |
| Athletes | Event | Result | Rank | Result | Rank |
|---|---|---|---|---|---|
| Alexia Sedykh | Girls' Hammer Throw | 59.02 | 2 Q | 59.08 | Gold medal |
| Sokhna Galle | Girls' Triple Jump | 12.92 | 2 Q | 13.04 | Silver medal |

== Badminton ==
Boys

| Athlete | Event | Group Stage | | | | Knock-Out Stage | | | |
| Athlete | Event | Match 1 | Match 2 | Match 3 | Rank | Quarterfinal | Semifinal | Final | Rank |
|---|---|---|---|---|---|---|---|---|---|
| Lucas Claerbout | Boys' Singles | Kumar (IND) L 0-2 (15-21, 14-21) | Keophiachan (LAO) W 2-0 (21-12, 21-8) | Coke (JAM) W 2-0 (21-6, 21-6) | 2 | Did not advance | | | |

Girls

| Athlete | Event | Group Stage | | | | Knock-Out Stage | | | |
| Athlete | Event | Match 1 | Match 2 | Match 3 | Rank | Quarterfinal | Semifinal | Final | Rank |
|---|---|---|---|---|---|---|---|---|---|
| Lea Palermo | Girls' Singles | Milne (GBR) L 0-2 (11-21, 18-21) | Mathis (AUT) W 2-0 (21-19, 21-12) | Ketpura (USA) L 0-2 (13-21, 13-21) | 3 | Did not advance | | | |

== Basketball ==
Girls

| Squad List | Event | Group Stage | | Placement Stage | | | Rank |
| Squad List | Event | Group D | Rank | 9th-16th | 9th-12th | 9th-10th | Rank |
|---|---|---|---|---|---|---|---|
| Onayssa Sbahi; Lou Mataly (C); Rudiane Eduardo; Justine Barthelemy | Girls' Basketball | Italy; L 11-26 | 4 | Czech Republic; W 29-24 | Russia; W 22-12 | Italy; L 18-26 | 10 |
| Onayssa Sbahi; Lou Mataly (C); Rudiane Eduardo; Justine Barthelemy | Girls' Basketball | Australia; L 15-21 | 4 | Czech Republic; W 29-24 | Russia; W 22-12 | Italy; L 18-26 | 10 |
| Onayssa Sbahi; Lou Mataly (C); Rudiane Eduardo; Justine Barthelemy | Girls' Basketball | Chile; W 30-15 | 4 | Czech Republic; W 29-24 | Russia; W 22-12 | Italy; L 18-26 | 10 |
| Onayssa Sbahi; Lou Mataly (C); Rudiane Eduardo; Justine Barthelemy | Girls' Basketball | Japan; L 20-34 | 4 | Czech Republic; W 29-24 | Russia; W 22-12 | Italy; L 18-26 | 10 |

== Boxing ==
Boys

| Athlete | Event | Preliminaries | Semifinals | Final | Rank |
|---|---|---|---|---|---|
| Tony Yoka | Super Heavyweight (+91kg) | Olkesandr Skoryi (UKR); W RSC R2 2:58 | Daniil Svaresciuc (MDA); W 5-0 | Joseph Parker (NZL); W 8-5 | Gold medal |

== Canoeing ==
Boys

| Athlete | Event | Time Trial | | Round 1 | Round 2 (Rep) | Round 3 | Round 4 | Round 5 | Final | Rank |
| Athlete | Event | Time | Rank | Round 1 | Round 2 (Rep) | Round 3 | Round 4 | Round 5 | Final | Rank |
|---|---|---|---|---|---|---|---|---|---|---|
| Guillaume Bernis | Boys' K1 Slalom | 1:27.00 | 2 | Dolata (POL); W 1:30.89-2:03.80 | | Silva (POR); W 1:29.62-1:41.11 | Ooi (SIN); W 1:28.68-1:36.92 | Urban (SVK); L 1:27.76-1:27.42 | Prskavec (CZE); L 1:29.02-1:28.23 | 4 |
| Guillaume Bernis | Boys' K1 Sprint | 1:36.47 | 15 | Kalashnikov (RUS); L 1:35.31-1:33.15 | Prskavec (CZE); W 1:37.58-1:52.09 | Liebscher (GER); L 1:36.76-1:30.48 | Did not advance | | | |

Girls

| Athlete | Event | Time Trial | | Round 1 | Round 2 (Rep) | Round 3 | Round 4 | Round 5 | Final |
| Athlete | Event | Time | Rank | Round 1 | Round 2 (Rep) | Round 3 | Round 4 | Round 5 | Final |
|---|---|---|---|---|---|---|---|---|---|
| Manon Hostens | Girls' K1 Slalom | 1:44.28 | 7 | Bruska (POL); W 1:41.33-2:05.31 | | Podolskaya (RUS); W 1:45.35-1:56.18 | Novak (SLO); L 1:46.83-1:39.54 | Did not advance | |
| Manon Hostens | Girls' K1 Sprint | 1:50.08 | 15 | Monleon (ESP); L 1:49.59-1:44.69 | Afef (TUN); W 1:49.82-1:57.33 | Huang (CHN); L 1:51.32-1:42.78 | Did not advance | | |

== Diving ==
Girls

| Athlete | Event | Preliminary | | Final | |
| Athlete | Event | Points | Rank | Points | Rank |
|---|---|---|---|---|---|
| Fanny Bouvet | Girls' 3m Springboard | 353.20 | 8 Q | 369.60 | 9 |

== Fencing ==
Group Stage

| Athlete | Event | Match 1 | Match 2 | Match 3 | Match 4 | Match 5 | Match 6 | Seed |
|---|---|---|---|---|---|---|---|---|
| Arthur Zatko | Boys' Sabre | Hübers (GER); W 5-4 | Sirbu (ROU); L 2-5 | Akula (BLR); L 3-5 | Wang (HKG); W 5-2 | Elsissy (EGY); W 5-2 | Kondo (NIG); W 5-2 | 4 |
| Kenza Boudad | Girls' Sabre | Seo (KOR); L 2-5 | Ciardullo (ITA); W 5-1 | Ahmed (EGY); W 5-3 | Egoryan (RUS); L 3-5 | Carreno (VEN); W 5-2 | | 7 |

Knock-Out Stage

| Athlete | Event | Round of 16 | Quarterfinals | Semifinals | Final | Rank |
|---|---|---|---|---|---|---|
| Arthur Zatko | Boys' Sabre | Kondo (NIG); W 15-4 | Song (KOR); L 11-15 | Did not advance | | 5 |
| Kenza Boudad | Girls' Sabre | Wator (POL); W 15-13 | Komaschuk (UKR); L 10-15 | Did not advance | | 7 |
| Europe 4 Kenza Boudad (FRA); Lucian Ciovica (ROU); Michala Cellerova (SVK); Arthur Zatko (FRA); Amalia Tătăran (ROU); Alexander Choupenitch (CZE) | Mixed Team | | Asia-Oceania 1 L 24-30 | 5th-8th Asia-Oceania 2 W 30-20 | 5th-6th Europe 3 W 30-29 | 5 |

== Gymnastics ==
=== Artistic Gymnastics ===
Boys

| Athlete | Event | Floor | | Pommel Horse | | Rings | | Vault | | Parallel Bars | | Horizontal Bar | | Total | |
| Athlete | Event | Score | Rank | Score | Rank | Score | Rank | Score | Rank | Score | Rank | Score | Rank | Score | Rank |
|---|---|---|---|---|---|---|---|---|---|---|---|---|---|---|---|
| Brandon Prost | Boys' Qualification | 13.350 | 23 | 13.050 | 21 | 13.250 | 24 | 14.600 | 37 | 13.700 | 10 | 13.150 | 22 | 81.100 | 17 Q |
| Brandon Prost | Boys' Individual All-Around | 13.300 | 16 | 13.100 | 11 | 13.300 | 13 | 15.150 | 9 | 12.600 | 16 | 13.250 | 14 | 80.700 | 15 |

Girls

| Athlete | Event | Vault | | Uneven Bars | | Beam | | Floor | | Total | |
| Athlete | Event | Score | Rank | Score | Rank | Score | Rank | Score | Rank | Score | Rank |
|---|---|---|---|---|---|---|---|---|---|---|---|
| Sophia Serseri | Girls' Qualification | 13.250 | 20 | 10.900 | 31 | 12.300 | 28 | 12.200 | 22 | 48.650 | 28 |

== Handball ==
| Squad List | Event | Group Stage | | Semifinal | 3rd place match | Rank |
| Squad List | Event | Group A | Rank | Semifinal | 3rd place match | Rank |
|---|---|---|---|---|---|---|
| Mathieu Merceron; Theophile Causse; Adrien Ballet-Kebengue; Jordan Bonilauri; Julian Emonet; O'Brian Nyateu; Hugo Descat; Bryan Jabea Njo; Laurent Lagier Pitre; Theo Derot; Benjamin Bataille; Timothey N'Guessan; Antoine Gutfreund; Kevin Rondel | Boys' Handball | Cook Islands; W 58-4 | 1 Q | Egypt; L 21-22 | Brazil; W 40-27 | Bronze medal |
| Mathieu Merceron; Theophile Causse; Adrien Ballet-Kebengue; Jordan Bonilauri; Julian Emonet; O'Brian Nyateu; Hugo Descat; Bryan Jabea Njo; Laurent Lagier Pitre; Theo Derot; Benjamin Bataille; Timothey N'Guessan; Antoine Gutfreund; Kevin Rondel | Boys' Handball | South Korea; W 39-36 | 1 Q | Egypt; L 21-22 | Brazil; W 40-27 | Bronze medal |

== Judo ==
Individual

| Athlete | Event | Round 1 | Round 2 | Round 3 | Semifinals | Final | Rank |
| Athlete | Event | Opposition Result | Opposition Result | Opposition Result | Opposition Result | Opposition Result | Rank |
|---|---|---|---|---|---|---|---|
| Julia Rosso-Richetto | Girls' -52 kg | Rasinska (POL); W 100-000 | Huck (AUT); L 000-001 | Repechage; Giuffrida (ITA); W 001-000 | Repechage; Rasinska (POL); L 000-100 | Did not advance | 7 |

Team

| Team | Event | Round 1 | Round 2 | Semifinals | Final | Rank |
| Team | Event | Opposition Result | Opposition Result | Opposition Result | Opposition Result | Rank |
|---|---|---|---|---|---|---|
| Barcelona; Julia Rosso-Richetto (FRA); Subash Yadav (IND); Yu-Chun Wu (TPE); Maxamillian Schneider (USA); Natalia Rak (EST); Michael Greiter (AUT); Gulnoza Matniyazova (UZB); Bolot Toktogonov (KGZ) | Mixed Team | Osaka; L 3-5 | Did not advance | | | 9 |

== Modern pentathlon ==
| Athlete | Event | Fencing (Épée One Touch) | | | Swimming (200m Freestyle) | | | Running & Shooting (3000m, Laser Pistol) | | | Total Points | Final Rank |
| Athlete | Event | Results | Rank | Points | Time | Rank | Points | Time | Rank | Points | Total Points | Final Rank |
|---|---|---|---|---|---|---|---|---|---|---|---|---|
| Valentin Prades | Boys' Individual | 13-10 | 6 | 880 | 2:14.00 | 18 | 1192 | 11:17.52 | 8 | 2292 | 4364 | 8 |
| Manon Carpentier | Girls' Individual | 9-14 | 14 | 720 | 2:24.54 | 11 | 1068 | 13:22.15 | 14 | 1792 | 3580 | 15 |
| Ela Sedilekova (SVK); Valentin Prades (FRA) | Mixed Relay | 56-36 | 2 | 920 | 2:10.03 | 21 | 1240 | 15:45.63 | 10 | 2300 | 4460 | 7 |
| Manon Carpentier (FRA); William Muinhos (BRA) | Mixed Relay | 35-57 | 22 | 710 | 2:06.88 | 14 | 1280 | 16:17.28 | 13 | 2172 | 4162 | 17 |

== Rowing ==
| Athlete | Event | Heats | | Repechage | | Semifinals | | Final | | Overall Rank |
| Athlete | Event | Time | Rank | Time | Rank | Time | Rank | Time | Rank | Overall Rank |
|---|---|---|---|---|---|---|---|---|---|---|
| Benoit Demey; William Chopy | Boys' Pair | 3:16.92 | 3 QA/B | | | 3:28.55 | 6 QB | 3:14.45 | 2 | 8 |
| Noemie Kober | Girls' Single Sculls | 3:50.09 | 1 QA/B | | | 3:52.04 | 1 QA | 3:44.80 | 3 | Bronze medal |

== Sailing ==
Windsurfing

| Athlete | Event | Race | | | | | | | | | | | Points | Rank |
| Athlete | Event | 1 | 2 | 3 | 4 | 5 | 6 | 7 | 8 | 9 | 10 | M* | Points | Rank |
|---|---|---|---|---|---|---|---|---|---|---|---|---|---|---|
| Maxime Labat | Boys' Techno 293 | 7 | 3 | 6 | 6 | 6 | 3 | ~~22~~ | 2 | 7 | 7 | 8 | 55 | 6 |
| Clidane Humeau | Girls' Techno 293 | 10 | 8 | ~~11~~ | 6 | 11 | 5 | 11 | 9 | 11 | 11 | 12 | 94 | 10 |

== Shooting ==
Pistol

| Athlete | Event | Qualification | | Final | | |
| Athlete | Event | Score | Rank | Score | Total | Rank |
|---|---|---|---|---|---|---|
| Vincent Jeanningros | Boys' 10m Air Pistol | 560 | 13 | Did not advance | | |

Rifle

| Athlete | Event | Qualification | | | Final | | |
| Athlete | Event | Score | Shoot-Off | Rank | Score | Total | Rank |
|---|---|---|---|---|---|---|---|
| Jennifer Olry | Girls' 10m Air Rifle | 391 | 49.7 | 9 | Did not advance | | |

== Swimming ==
Boys

| Athletes | Event | Heat | | Semifinal | | Final | |
| Athletes | Event | Time | Position | Time | Position | Time | Position |
|---|---|---|---|---|---|---|---|
| Ganesh Pedurand | Boys' 400m Freestyle | 4:01.02 | 9 | | | Did not advance | |
| Ganesh Pedurand | Boys' 200m Individual Medley | 2:04.07 | 7 Q | | | 2:04.21 | 7 |
| Jordan Coelho | Boys' 100m Butterfly | 54.19 | 2 Q | 54.11 | 5 Q | 53.96 | 5 |
| Jordan Coelho | Boys' 200m Butterfly | 2:00.37 | 2 Q | | | 1:59.18 | 4 |
| Mehdy Metella | Boys' 100m Freestyle | 51.25 | 6 Q | 50.21 | 2 Q | 49.99 | Gold medal |
| Mehdy Metella | Boys' 100m Butterfly | 54.81 | 9 Q | 54.30 | 7 Q | 54.35 | 7 |
| Thomas Rabeisen | Boys' 100m Breaststroke | 1:03.55 | 6 Q | 1:03.61 | 6 Q | 1:03.62 | 6 |
| Thomas Rabeisen | Boys' 200m Breaststroke | 2:20.77 | 11 | | | Did not advance | |
| Mehdy Metella; Thomas Rabeisen; Ganesh Pedurand; Jordan Coelho | Boys' 4 × 100 m Freestyle Relay | 3:27.19 | 5 Q | | | 3:25.63 | 6 |
| Mehdy Metella; Thomas Rabeisen; Ganesh Pedurand; Jordan Coelho | Boys' 4 × 100 m Medley Relay | 3:47.30 | 4 Q | | | 3:43.84 | Silver medal |

Girls

| Athletes | Event | Heat | | Semifinal | | Final | |
| Athletes | Event | Time | Position | Time | Position | Time | Position |
|---|---|---|---|---|---|---|---|
| Anna Santamans | Girls' 50m Freestyle | 25.74 | 1 Q | 25.48 | 1 Q | 25.40 | Gold medal |
| Anna Santamans | Girls' 50m Butterfly | 27.94 | 4 Q | 27.51 | 4 Q | 27.34 | Bronze medal |
| Marie Jugnet | Girls' 100m Backstroke | 1:04.77 | 12 Q | 1:04.02 | 7 Q | 1:03.65 | 7 |
| Marie Jugnet | Girls' 200m Backstroke | 2:15.53 | 5 Q | | | 2:13.60 | 4 |
| Mathilde Cini | Girls' 100m Freestyle | 59.43 | 29 | Did not advance | | | |
| Mathilde Cini | Girls' 50m Backstroke | 29.70 | 2 Q | 29.22 | 1 Q | 29.19 | Gold medal |

Mixed

| Athletes | Event | Heat | | Semifinal | | Final | |
| Athletes | Event | Time | Position | Time | Position | Time | Position |
|---|---|---|---|---|---|---|---|
| Mehdy Metella; Anna Santamans; Mathilde Cini; Jordan Coelho | Mixed 4 × 100 m Freestyle Relay | 3:37.03 | 3 Q | | | 3:35.90 | Bronze medal |
| Mehdy Metella*; Marie Jugnet; Mathilde Cini; Thomas Rabeisen; Jordan Coelho | Mixed 4 × 100 m Medley Relay | 4:00.82 | 4 Q | | | 3:56.64 | 4 |

- * raced in heats only

== Table tennis ==
Individual

| Athlete | Event | Round 1 | | Round 2 | | Quarterfinals | Semifinals | Final | Rank |
| Athlete | Event | Group Matches | Rank | Group Matches | Rank | Quarterfinals | Semifinals | Final | Rank |
|---|---|---|---|---|---|---|---|---|---|
| Simon Gauzy | Boys' singles | Jouti (BRA); W 3-0 (15-13, 11-2, 11-4) | 1 Q | Kulpa (POL); W 3-0 (14-12, 11-8, 13-11) | 1 Q | Vanrossomme (BEL); W 4-1 (11-6, 11-7, 10-12, 11-8, 11-6) | Niwa (JPN); L 0-4 (7-11, 12-14, 4-11, 8-11) | Lakatos (HUN); W 4-1 (11-2, 12-10, 9-11, 11-9, 11-8) | Bronze medal |
| Simon Gauzy | Boys' singles | Hageraats (NED); W 3-1 (11-9, 14-12, 5-11, 11-7) | 1 Q | Chiu (HKG); W 3-1 (8-11, 11-4, 11-6, 11-5) | 1 Q | Vanrossomme (BEL); W 4-1 (11-6, 11-7, 10-12, 11-8, 11-6) | Niwa (JPN); L 0-4 (7-11, 12-14, 4-11, 8-11) | Lakatos (HUN); W 4-1 (11-2, 12-10, 9-11, 11-9, 11-8) | Bronze medal |
| Simon Gauzy | Boys' singles | Holikov (UZB); W 3-0 (11-4, 11-1, 11-5) | 1 Q | Fucec (CRO); W 3-2 (11-8, 8-11, 6-11, 11-7, 11-3) | 1 Q | Vanrossomme (BEL); W 4-1 (11-6, 11-7, 10-12, 11-8, 11-6) | Niwa (JPN); L 0-4 (7-11, 12-14, 4-11, 8-11) | Lakatos (HUN); W 4-1 (11-2, 12-10, 9-11, 11-9, 11-8) | Bronze medal |
| Celine Pang | Girls' singles | Yang (KOR); L 2-3 (11-7, 10-12, 7-11, 11-9, 5-11) | 3 qB | Rosheuvel (GUY); W 3-0 (11-5, 11-4, 11-6) | 1 | Did not advance | | | 17 |
| Celine Pang | Girls' singles | Ivoso (CGO); W 3-0 (11-3, 11-9, 11-2) | 3 qB | Baravok (BLR); W 3-2 (11-9, 8-11, 5-11, 11-3, 11-8) | 1 | Did not advance | | | 17 |
| Celine Pang | Girls' singles | Bliznet (MDA); L 0-3 (5-11, 7-11, 4-11) | 3 qB | Phan (AUS); W 3-0 (11-7, 12-10, 12-10) | 1 | Did not advance | | | 17 |

Team

| Athlete | Event | Round 1 | | Round 2 | Quarterfinals | Semifinals | Final | Rank |
| Athlete | Event | Group Matches | Rank | Round 2 | Quarterfinals | Semifinals | Final | Rank |
|---|---|---|---|---|---|---|---|---|
| France; Celine Pang (FRA); Simon Gauzy (FRA) | Mixed team | Europe 6 Galic (SLO); Leitgeb (AUT); W 2-1 (3-0, 3-0, 2-3) | 1 Q | DPR Korea; Kim (PRK); Kim (PRK); L 0-2 (0-3, 0-3) | Did not advance | | | 9 |
| France; Celine Pang (FRA); Simon Gauzy (FRA) | Mixed team | Europe 2 Xiao (POR); Vanrossomme (BEL); W 2-1 (0-3, 3-1, 3-1) | 1 Q | DPR Korea; Kim (PRK); Kim (PRK); L 0-2 (0-3, 0-3) | Did not advance | | | 9 |
| France; Celine Pang (FRA); Simon Gauzy (FRA) | Mixed team | Intercontinental 3 Phan (AUS); Mejia (ESA); W 3-0 (3-0, 3-0, 3-0) | 1 Q | DPR Korea; Kim (PRK); Kim (PRK); L 0-2 (0-3, 0-3) | Did not advance | | | 9 |

== Taekwondo ==
| Athlete | Event | Preliminary | Quarterfinal | Semifinal | Final | Rank |
|---|---|---|---|---|---|---|
| Hajer Mustapha | Girls' -44kg | BYE | Seyma Tuncer (TUN); L 2-4 | Did not advance | | 5 |
| Samantha Silvestri | Girls' -63kg | BYE | Sephora Baelenge (COD); W 15-1 | Antonia Katheder (GER); L 1-12 | Did not advance | Bronze medal |
| Faiza Taoussara | Girls' +63kg | BYE | Jo-Wei Lin (TPE); W 4-3 | Briseida Acosta (MEX); L 7-7+ | Did not advance | Bronze medal |

== Triathlon ==
Men's

| Athlete | Event | Swim (1.5 km) | Trans 1 | Bike (40 km) | Trans 2 | Run (10 km) | Total | Rank |
|---|---|---|---|---|---|---|---|---|
| Jeremy Obozil | Individual | 8:53 | 0:29 | 28:28 | 0:22 | 18:09 | 56:21.21 | 7 |

Mixed

| Athlete | Event | Total Times per Athlete (Swim 250 m, Bike 7 km, Run 1.7 km) | Total Group Time | Rank |
|---|---|---|---|---|
| Marlene Gomez (GER); Jeremy Obozil (FRA); Laura Casey (IRL); Lukas Kocar (CZE) | Mixed Team Relay; Europe 2 | 20:53; 19:47; 21:54; 19:37 | 1:22:11.38 | 4 |
