= Fencing at the 2010 Summer Youth Olympics – Cadet male sabre =

These are the results of the cadet male sabre competition at the 2010 Summer Youth Olympics. The competition was held on August 15.

== Results ==
=== Pool Round ===
==== Pool 1 ====
| # | Name | Bouts | | | | | | | V | Ind | TG | TR | Diff | Rank |
| # | Name | 1 | 2 | 3 | 4 | 5 | 6 | 7 | V | Ind | TG | TR | Diff | Rank |
|---|---|---|---|---|---|---|---|---|---|---|---|---|---|---|
| 1 | Richard Hübers (GER) | | 4D | 5V | 5V | 5V | 5V | 5V | 5 | 0.833 | 29 | 13 | +16 | 1 |
| 2 | Arthur Zatko (FRA) | 5V | | 2D | 3D | 5V | 5V | 5V | 4 | 0.667 | 25 | 20 | +5 | 3 |
| 3 | Dragoș Sîrbu (ROU) | 4D | 5V | | 2D | 5V | 2D | 5V | 3 | 0.500 | 23 | 21 | +2 | 4 |
| 4 | Mikhail Akula (BLR) | 2D | 5V | 5V | | 5V | 5V | 5V | 5 | 0.833 | 27 | 12 | +15 | 2 |
| 5 | Wang Jackson (HKG) | 1D | 2D | 4D | 1D | | 5V | 5V | 2 | 0.333 | 18 | 22 | –4 | 5 |
| 6 | Ziad Elsissy (EGY) | 1D | 2D | 5V | 1D | 2D | | 5V | 2 | 0.333 | 16 | 23 | –7 | 6 |
| 7 | Djibrilla Issaka Kondo (NIG) | 0D | 2D | 0D | 0D | 0D | 1D | | 0 | 0.000 | 3 | 30 | –27 | 7 |

==== Pool 2 ====
| # | Name | Bouts | | | | | | V | Ind | TG | TR | Diff | Rank |
| # | Name | 1 | 2 | 3 | 4 | 5 | 6 | V | Ind | TG | TR | Diff | Rank |
|---|---|---|---|---|---|---|---|---|---|---|---|---|---|
| 1 | András Szatmári (HUN) | | 3D | 4D | 5V | 5V | 5V | 3 | 0.600 | 22 | 14 | +8 | 2 |
| 2 | Will Spear (USA) | 5V | | 5V | 3D | 1D | 5V | 3 | 0.600 | 19 | 16 | +3 | 3 |
| 3 | Artur Okunev (RUS) | 5V | 2D | | 5V | 3D | 5V | 3 | 0.600 | 20 | 20 | 0 | 4 |
| 4 | Miguel Breault-Mallette (CAN) | 1D | 5V | 3D | | 2D | 5V | 2 | 0.400 | 16 | 21 | –5 | 5 |
| 5 | Leonardo Affede (ITA) | 3D | 5V | 5V | 5V | | 5V | 4 | 0.800 | 23 | 15 | +8 | 1 |
| 6 | Song Jong-hun (KOR) | 0D | 1D | 3D | 3D | 4D | | 0 | 0.000 | 11 | 25 | –14 | 6 |

=== Bracket ===
Round of 16
1 | Richard Hubers (GER)
16 | BYE
9 | Miguel Breault-Mallette (CAN) | 8
8 | Dragos Sirbu (ROU) | 15
5 | András Szatmári (HUN) | 14
12 | Song Jong-Hun (KOR) | 15
13 | Djibrilla Issaka Kondo (NIG) | 4
4 | Arthur Zatko (FRA) | 15
3 | Leonardo Affede (ITA)
14 | BYE
11 | Ziad Elsissy (EGY) | 10
6 | Will Spear (USA) | 15
7 | Artur Okunev (RUS) | 15
10 | Wang Jackson (HKG) | 14
15 | BYE
2 | Mikhail Akula (BLR)

Quarterfinals
1 | Richard Hubers (GER) | 15
8 | Dragos Sirbu (ROU) | 10
12 | Song Jong-Hun (KOR) | 15
4 | Arthur Zatko (FRA) | 11
3 | Leonardo Affede (ITA) | 15
6 | Will Spear (USA) | 9
7 | Artur Okunev (RUS) | 12
2 | Mikhail Akula (BLR) | 15

Semifinals
1 | Richard Hubers (GER) | 11
12 | Song Jong-Hun (KOR) | 15
3 | Leonardo Affede (ITA) | 15
2 | Mikhail Akula (BLR) | 12

Final
12 | Song Jong-Hun (KOR) | 15
3 | Leonardo Affede (ITA) | 8

| Bronze Medal |
| 1 | Richard Hubers (GER) | 15 |
| 2 | Mikhail Akula (BLR) | 13 |

== Final standings ==
| Rank | Name | NOC | Team |
|---|---|---|---|
| 1st place, gold medalist(s) | Song Jong-Hun | South Korea | Asia 1 |
| 2nd place, silver medalist(s) | Leonardo Affede | Italy | Europe 1 |
| 3rd place, bronze medalist(s) | Richard Hubers | Germany | Europe 2 |
| 4 | Mikhail Akula | Belarus | Europe 3 |
| 5 | Arthur Zatko | France | Europe 4 |
| 6 | Will Spear | United States | Americas 1 |
| 7 | Artur Okunev | Russia | |
| 8 | Dragos Sirbu | Romania | |
| 9 | András Szatmári | Hungary | |
| 10 | Miguel Breault-Mallette | Canada | Americas 2 |
| 11 | Wang Jackson | Hong Kong | Asia 2 |
| 12 | Ziad Elsissy | Egypt | Africa |
| 13 | Djibrilla Issaka Kondo | Niger | |
