= Niger at the 2010 Summer Youth Olympics =

- IOC code: NIG
- NOC: Comité Olympique et Sportif National du Nigér

in Singapore
- Competitors: 2 in 2 sports
- Flag bearer: Djibrilla Issaka Kondo

Summer Youth Olympics appearances
- 2010; 2014; 2018

Niger competed at the 2010 Summer Youth Olympics, the inaugural Youth Olympic Games, held in Singapore from 14 August to 26 August 2010.

== Fencing ==
Group stage

Athlete	Event	Match 1	Match 2	Match 3	Match 4	Match 5	Match 6	Seed
Djibrilla Issaka Kondo	Boys' Sabre	Hubers (GER); L 0-5	Zatko (FRA); L 2-5	Sirbu (ROU); L 0-5	Akula (BLR); L 0-5	Wang (HKG); L 0-5	Elsissy (EGY); L 1-5	13

Knock-Out Stage

Athlete	Event	Round of 16	Quarterfinals	Semifinals	Final	Rank
Djibrilla Issaka Kondo	Boys' Sabre	Zatko (FRA); L 4-15	Did not advance			13

== Swimming ==
Athletes	Event	Heat		Semifinal		Final	
Athletes	Event	Time	Position	Time	Position	Time	Position
Maimouna Boubacar Badie	Girls' 100m Breaststroke	DSQ		Did not advance			
Maimouna Boubacar Badie	Girls' 200m Breaststroke	DNS				Did not advance	
