= 2011 World Youth Championships in Athletics – Girls' triple jump =

Girls' triple jump at the 2011 World Youth Championships in Athletics
- Venue: Stadium Lille Métropole
- Dates: 6 July (qualification); 8 July (final)
- Competitors: 32
- Winning distance: 13.62

Medalists
gold medal	Sokhna Galle	France
silver medal	Li Jingyu	China
bronze medal	Ana Peleteiro	Spain

The girls' triple jump at the 2011 World Youth Championships in Athletics was held at the Stadium Lille Métropole on 6 and 8 July.

== Medalists ==
Gold	Silver	Bronze
Sokhna Galle; France	Li Jingyu; China	Ana Peleteiro; Spain

== Records ==
Prior to the competition, the following records were as follows.

World Youth Best	Huang Qiuyan (CHN)	14.57	Shanghai, China	19 October 1997
Championship Record	Cristine Spataru (ROU)	13.86	Sherbrooke, Canada	11 July 2003
World Youth Leading	Khaddi Sagnia (SWE)	13.52	Sollentuna, Sweden	22 June 2011

== Qualification ==
Qualification rule: qualification standard 12.85 m or at least best 12 qualified.

=== Group A ===
Rank	Name	Nationality	#1	#2	#3	Result	Notes
1	Sokhna Galle	France	11.02	13.42		13.42	Q, PB
2	Li Jingyu	China	x	12.63	13.11	13.11	Q
3	Anna Krasutska	Ukraine	13.03			13.03	Q, PB
4	Paola Borović	Croatia	12.67	12.73	12.31	12.73	q
5	Francesca Lanciano	Italy	x	x	12.69	12.69	q, PB
6	Lynn Johnson	Sweden	x	12.63	x	12.63	q
7	Margarita Kuskova	Russia	12.26	x	12.56	12.56	
8	Dilyara Abuova	Kazakhstan	12.45	11.93	11.05	12.45	
9	Amira Bendrif	Morocco	12.19	12.44	12.43	12.44	PB
10	Ariadna Ramos	Spain	12.42	x	x	12.42	
11	Laetitia Bruun	Denmark	12.29	x	x	12.29	PB
12	Elena Panțuroiu	Romania	x	x	12.19	12.19	
13	Carla Forbes	United States	12.12	11.93	11.91	12.12	
14	Mayra Chila	Ecuador	11.91	x	11.81	11.91	
15	Parichat Sukthawisathitkun	Thailand	11.88	11.73	11.61	11.88	
16	Terje Meister	Estonia	x	11.78	11.81	11.81	

=== Group B ===
Rank	Name	Nationality	#1	#2	#3	Result	Notes
1	Khaddi Sagnia	Sweden	13.64			13.64	Q, WYL
2	Ana Peleteiro	Spain	13.02			13.02	Q
3	Dior Delophont	France	12.88			12.88	Q
4	Esra Emiroğlu	Turkey	12.74	12.59	12.84	12.84	q
5	Viktoria Leonova	Russia	12.51	12.58	12.80	12.80	q
6	Andreea Lefcenco	Romania	x	12.09	12.63	12.63	q
7	Hanna Keppler	Germany	12.41	x	12.56	12.56	
8	Ottavia Cestonaro	Italy	x	12.55	x	12.55	
9	Fu Luna	China	12.13	12.42	12.13	12.42	
10	Jennifer Madu	United States	12.42	12.06	x	12.42	
11	Daniela Jorquera	Chile	12.17	11.83	12.23	12.23	
12	Elza Noriņa	Latvia	x	12.23	x	12.23	
13	Thea LaFond	Dominica	11.67	x	12.15	12.15	
14	Monika Baňovičová	Slovakia	11.82	12.05	11.48	12.05	
15	Nastassia Liavonava	Belarus	x	11.89	x	11.89	
16	Lerato Sechele	Lesotho	11.52	11.74	x	11.74	

== Final ==
Rank	Name	Nationality	#1	#2	#3	#4	#5	#6	Result	Notes
1st place, gold medalist(s)	Sokhna Galle	France	12.39	13.62	x	13.39	x	12.19	13.62	
2nd place, silver medalist(s)	Li Jingyu	China	x	13.29	x	13.57	13.39	x	13.57	PB
3rd place, bronze medalist(s)	Ana Peleteiro	Spain	12.92	12.88	12.51	12.56	12.77	12.63	12.92	
4	Viktoria Leonova	Russia	x	12.85	12.66	12.92	x	12.30	12.92	
5	Lynn Johnson	Sweden	12.90	12.76	x	12.91	x	x	12.91	
6	Anna Krasutska	Ukraine	12.19	12.77	12.75	12.76	12.91	12.89	12.91	
7	Esra Emiroğlu	Turkey	12.90	12.76	12.78	x	x	12.43	12.90	
8	Paola Borović	Croatia	12.34	12.67	12.82	12.60	12.61	12.54	12.82	
9	Khaddi Sagnia	Sweden	x	x	12.72				12.72	
10	Dior Delophont	France	x	12.56	12.59				12.59	
11	Francesca Lanciano	Italy	x	12.28	x				12.28	
12	Andreea Lefcenco	Romania	12.27	x	12.20				12.27	
