= Table tennis at the 2010 Summer Youth Olympics – Women's singles =

The girls' singles table tennis event was a part of the table tennis program at the 2010 Summer Youth Olympics and took place at the Singapore Indoor Stadium. The tournament started on August 21 with the final on August 23.

32 athletes took part in the girls' single event. Athletes were split into eight groups where they would play a round robin. The top two from each group would proceed to the next round where they are placed in another group where another round robin is played, while the bottom two from the first round played in a consolation round robin. The top two from that group would proceed to the quarterfinals where there was a single elimination tournament with a bronze medal final.

== Medalists ==
Gold	Silver	Bronze
Gu Yuting; China	Isabelle Siyun Li; Singapore	Yang Ha-eun; South Korea

== Group stages ==
=== Round 1 ===
==== Group A ====
Athlete	Pld	W	L	MW	ML
Song I Kim (PRK)	2	2	0	6	2
Yuting Gu (CHN)	2	1	1	5	3
Mallika Bhandarkar (IND)	2	0	2	0	6
Petrissa Solja (GER)	Withdrew				

21 August
10:00
Yuting Gu (CHN)	3-0 (11–7, 11–7, 11–7)	Mallika Bhandarkar (IND)	Table 3
12:00
Yuting Gu (CHN)	2-3 (8–11, 11–6, 10–12, 11–3, 9–11)	Song I Kim (PRK)	Table 1
14:00
Song I Kim (PRK)	3-0 (11–6, 11–7, 11–7)	Mallika Bhandarkar (IND)	Table 3

==== Group B ====
Athlete	Pld	W	L	MW	ML
Yang Ha-eun (KOR)	3	3	0	9	2
Olga Bliznet (MDA)	3	2	1	6	3
Celine Pang (FRA)	3	1	2	5	6
Jolie Mafuta Ivoso (CGO)	3	0	3	0	9

21 August
10:30
Yang Ha-eun (KOR)	3-2 (7-11, 12–10, 11–7, 9-11, 11-5)	Celine Pang (FRA)	Table 3
10:30
Olga Bliznet (MDA)	3-0 (11–3, 11–6, 11-3)	Jolie Mafuta Ivoso (CGO)	Table 4
12:30
Yang Ha-eun (KOR)	3-0 (11–8, 11–5, 11-8)	Olga Bliznet (MDA)	Table 4
12:30
Celine Pang (FRA)	3-0 (11–3, 11–9, 11-2)	Jolie Mafuta Ivoso (CGO)	Table 5
14:30
Yang Ha-eun (KOR)	3-0 (11–2, 11–4, 11-4)	Jolie Mafuta Ivoso (CGO)	Table 3
14:30
Olga Bliznet (MDA)	3-0 (11–5, 11–7, 11-4)	Celine Pang (FRA)	Table 4

==== Group C ====
Athlete	Pld	W	L	MW	ML
Suthasini Sawettabut (THA)	3	3	0	9	2
Maria Xiao (POR)	3	2	1	8	3
Mercedes Nagyvaradi (HUN)	3	1	2	3	6
Islem Laid (ALG)	3	0	3	0	9

21 August
10:00
Suthasini Sawettabut (THA)	3-0 (11–4, 11–5, 11-3)	Mercedes Nagyvaradi (HUN)	Table 1
10:00
Maria Xiao (POR)	3-0 (11–5, 11–7, 11-7)	Islem Laid (ALG)	Table 5
12:00
Suthasini Sawettabut (THA)	3-2 (11–8, 8-11, 11–6, 13-15, 12-10)	Maria Xiao (POR)	Table 2
12:00
Mercedes Nagyvaradi (HUN)	3-0 (11–5, 13–11, 11-1)	Islem Laid (ALG)	Table 3
14:00
Suthasini Sawettabut (THA)	3-0 (11–5, 11–3, 11-1)	Islem Laid (ALG)	Table 4
14:00
Maria Xiao (POR)	3-0 (16–14, 11–6, 11-8)	Mercedes Nagyvaradi (HUN)	Table 2

==== Group D ====
Athlete	Pld	W	L	MW	ML
Yana Noskova (RUS)	3	3	0	9	0
Caroline Kumahara (BRA)	3	2	1	6	3
Hsin Huang (TPE)	3	1	2	3	6
Adielle Rosheuvel (GUY)	3	0	3	0	9

21 August
10:30
Yana Noskova (RUS)	3-0 (17–15, 11–5, 11-7)	Hsin Huang (TPE)	Table 2
10:30
Caroline Kumahara (BRA)	3-0 (11–3, 11–2, 11-6)	Adielle Rosheuvel (GUY)	Table 5
12:30
Yana Noskova (RUS)	3-0 (12–10, 11–7, 11-9)	Caroline Kumahara (BRA)	Table 2
12:30
Hsin Huang (TPE)	3-0 (11–6, 11–4, 11-2)	Adielle Rosheuvel (GUY)	Table 3
14:30
Yana Noskova (RUS)	3-0 (11–4, 11–4, 11-2)	Adielle Rosheuvel (GUY)	Table 7
14:30
Caroline Kumahara (BRA)	3-0 (11–9, 11–8, 11-6)	Hsin Huang (TPE)	Table 1

==== Group E ====
Athlete	Pld	W	L	MW	ML
Britt Eerland (NED)	3	3	0	9	1
Bernadette Szocs (ROU)	3	2	1	7	4
Katsiaryna Baravok (BLR)	3	1	2	4	6
Letizia Giardi (SMR)	3	0	3	0	9

21 August
10:00
Bernadette Szocs (ROU)	3-1 (9-11, 11–8, 11–9, 11-8)	Katsiaryna Baravok (BLR)	Table 6
10:00
Britt Eerland (NED)	3-0 (11–3, 11–6, 11-2)	Letizia Giardi (SMR)	Table 7
12:00
Bernadette Szocs (ROU)	1-3 (11–8, 7-11, 7-11, 9-11)	Britt Eerland (NED)	Table 5
12:00
Katsiaryna Baravok (BLR)	3-0 (11–5, 11–9, 11-5)	Letizia Giardi (SMR)	Table 4
14:00
Bernadette Szocs (ROU)	3-0 (11–4, 11–5, 11-3)	Letizia Giardi (SMR)	Table 5
14:00
Britt Eerland (NED)	3-0 (11–5, 11–6, 11-5)	Katsiaryna Baravok (BLR)	Table 7

==== Group F ====
Athlete	Pld	W	L	MW	ML
Ayuka Tanioka (JPN)	3	3	0	9	3
Isabelle Siyun Li (SIN)	3	2	1	8	3
Alice Loveridge (GBR)	3	1	2	4	6
Julia Wu (NZL)	3	0	3	0	9

21 August
10:30
Isabelle Siyun Li (SIN)	3-0 (14–12, 11–1, 11-3)	Alice Loveridge (GBR)	Table 1
10:30
Ayuka Tanioka (JPN)	3-0 (11–7, 11–3, 11-4)	Julia Wu (NZL)	Table 6
12:30
Isabelle Siyun Li (SIN)	2-3 (9-11, 5-11, 11–9, 18-16, 6-11)	Ayuka Tanioka (JPN)	Table 6
12:30
Alice Loveridge (GBR)	3-0 (13–11, 11–9, 11-7)	Julia Wu (NZL)	Table 7
14:30
Isabelle Siyun Li (SIN)	3-0 (11–3, 11–2, 11-5)	Julia Wu (NZL)	Table 6
14:30
Ayuka Tanioka (JPN)	3-1 (9-11, 11–6, 11–4, 11-2)	Alice Loveridge (GBR)	Table 2

==== Group G ====
Athlete	Pld	W	L	MW	ML
Mateja Jeger (CRO)	3	3	0	9	2
Dina Meshref (EGY)	3	2	1	6	5
Alex Galic (SLO)	3	1	2	6	6
Lily Phan (AUS)	3	0	3	1	9

21 August
10:00
Mateja Jeger (CRO)	3-1 (5-11, 12–10, 11–4, 12-10)	Alex Galic (SLO)	Table 2
10:00
Dina Meshref (EGY)	3-0 (11–6, 11–7, 11-6)	Lily Phan (AUS)	Table 4
12:00
Mateja Jeger (CRO)	3-0 (12–10, 11–5, 13-11)	Dina Meshref (EGY)	Table 7
12:00
Alex Galic (SLO)	3-0 (20–18, 13–11, 11-9)	Lily Phan (AUS)	Table 6
14:00
Mateja Jeger (CRO)	3-1 (11–4, 5-11, 11–5, 12-10)	Lily Phan (AUS)	Table 1
14:00
Dina Meshref (EGY)	3-2 (11–3, 9-11, 11–9, 5-11, 11-7)	Alex Galic (SLO)	Table 8

==== Group H ====
Athlete	Pld	W	L	MW	ML
Ka Yee Ng (HKG)	3	3	0	9	3
Ariel Hsing (USA)	3	2	1	8	4
Carelyn Cordero (PUR)	3	1	2	4	8
Nuwani Vithanage (SRI)	3	0	3	3	9

21 August
10:30
Ariel Hsing (USA)	3-0 (11–8, 11–9, 11-6)	Carelyn Cordero (PUR)	Table 7
10:30
Ka Yee Ng (HKG)	3-0 (11–4, 11–8, 11-4)	Nuwani Vithanage (SRI)	Table 8
12:30
Ariel Hsing (USA)	2-3 (11–9, 7-11, 11–7, 9-11, 3-11)	Ka Yee Ng (HKG)	Table 1
12:30
Carelyn Cordero (PUR)	3-2 (8-11, 11–8, 11–4, 8-11, 11-9)	Nuwani Vithanage (SRI)	Table 8
14:30
Ariel Hsing (USA)	3-1 (11–9, 11–5, 6-11, 11-9)	Nuwani Vithanage (SRI)	Table 5
14:30
Ka Yee Ng (HKG)	3-1 (11–9, 8-11, 11–7, 12-10)	Carelyn Cordero (PUR)	Table 8

=== Round 2 ===
==== Group AA ====
Athlete	Pld	W	L	MW	ML
Bernadette Szocs (ROU)	3	2	1	6	5
Kim Song-i (PRK)	3	2	1	6	5
Maria Xiao (POR)	3	1	2	6	7
Ka Yee Ng (HKG)	3	1	2	5	6

21 August
18:00
Kim Song-i (PRK)	3-1 (7-11, 11–1, 11–9, 13-11)	Maria Xiao (POR)	Table 3
18:00
Ka Yee Ng (HKG)	3-0 (11–5, 11–8, 11-4)	Bernadette Szőcs (ROU)	Table 5
22 August
10:00
Kim Song-i (PRK)	3-1 (12–10, 9-11, 11–6, 11-9)	Ka Yee Ng (HKG)	Table 3
10:00
Maria Xiao (POR)	2-3 (12-14, 11–6, 11–3, 3-11, 5-11)	Bernadette Szőcs (ROU)	Table 6
12:00
Kim Song-i (PRK)	0-3 (9-11, 8-11, 8-11)	Bernadette Szőcs (ROU)	Table 5
12:00
Ka Yee Ng (HKG)	1-3 (15–13, 7-11, 3-11, 8-11)	Maria Xiao (POR)	Table 6

==== Group BB ====
Athlete	Pld	W	L	MW	ML
Yang Ha-eun (KOR)	3	2	1	7	3
Isabelle Siyun Li (SIN)	3	2	1	6	4
Ariel Hsing (USA)	3	1	2	4	8
Mateja Jeger (CRO)	3	1	2	5	7

21 August
18:00
Yang Ha-eun (KOR)	3-0 (11–8, 11–5, 11-5)	Isabelle Siyun Li (SIN)	Table 1
18:00
Mateja Jeger (CRO)	2-3 (7-11, 7-11, 11–5, 14-12, 7-11)	Ariel Hsing (USA)	Table 6
22 August
10:00
Yang Ha-eun (KOR)	1-3 (8-11, 6-11, 11-6, 8-11)	Mateja Jeger (CRO)	Table 4
10:00
Isabelle Siyun Li (SIN)	3-1 (10-12, 11–5, 11–4, 11-9)	Ariel Hsing (USA)	Table 1
12:00
Yang Ha-eun (KOR)	3-0 (11–8, 13–11, 11-6)	Ariel Hsing (USA)	Table 7
12:00
Mateja Jeger (CRO)	0-3 (8-11, 6-11, 8-11)	Isabelle Siyun Li (SIN)	Table 8

==== Group CC ====
Athlete	Pld	W	L	MW	ML
Suthasini Sawettabut (THA)	3	3	0	9	3
Olga Bliznet (MDA)	3	2	1	7	3
Britt Eerland (NED)	3	1	2	5	6
Caroline Kumahara (BRA)	3	0	3	0	9

21 August
18:00
Suthasini Sawettabut (THA)	3-1 (11–9, 11–8, 11-13, 11-0)	Olga Bliznet (MDA)	Table 4
18:00
Britt Eerland (NED)	3-0 (11–9, 11–8, 11-5)	Caroline Kumahara (BRA)	Table 7
22 August
10:00
Suthasini Sawettabut (THA)	3-2 (7-11, 11–4, 12–10, 9-11, 11-6)	Britt Eerland (NED)	Table 2
10:00
Olga Bliznet (MDA)	3-0 (11–8, 11–8, 11-6)	Caroline Kumahara (BRA)	Table 7
12:00
Suthasini Sawettabut (THA)	3-0 (11–7, 11–9, 11-3)	Caroline Kumahara (BRA)	Table 2
12:00
Britt Eerland (NED)	0-3 (7-11, 4-11, 9-11)	Olga Bliznet (MDA)	Table 4

==== Group DD ====
Athlete	Pld	W	L	MW	ML
Yuting Gu (CHN)	3	3	0	9	0
Ayuka Tanioka (JPN)	3	2	1	6	5
Yana Noskova (RUS)	3	1	2	4	7
Dina Meshref (EGY)	3	0	3	2	9

21 August
18:00
Yana Noskova (RUS)	0-3 (12-14, 9-11, 6-11)	Yuting Gu (CHN)	Table 2
18:00
Ayuka Tanioka (JPN)	3-1 (12–10, 10-12, 11–7, 11-4)	Dina Meshref (EGY)	Table 8
22 August
10:00
Yana Noskova (RUS)	1-3 (7-11, 11–7, 10-12, 7-11)	Ayuka Tanioka (JPN)	Table 5
10:00
Yuting Gu (CHN)	3-0 (11–9, 11–7, 11-5)	Dina Meshref (EGY)	Table 8
12:00
Yana Noskova (RUS)	3-1 (11–8, 11-13, 11–7, 12-10)	Dina Meshref (EGY)	Table 3
12:00
Ayuka Tanioka (JPN)	0-3 (2-11, 2-11, 10-12)	Yuting Gu (CHN)	Table 1

=== Consolation round ===
Bottom two athletes from each group in round 1 compete here.

==== Group EE ====
Athlete	Pld	W	L	MW	ML
Mercedes Nagyvaradi (HUN)	2	2	0	6	2
Mallika Bhandarkar (IND)	2	1	1	5	3
Jolie Mafuta Ivoso (CGO)	2	0	2	0	6
Petrissa Solja (GER)	Withdrew				

21 August
18:30
Mallika Bhandarkar (IND)	3-0 (11–4, 11–6, 11-2)	Jolie Mafuta Ivoso (CGO)	Table 3
22 August
10:30
Mallika Bhandarkar (IND)	2-3 (2-11, 9-11, 11–8, 11-8, 2-11)	Mercedes Nagyvaradi (HUN)	Table 3
12:30
Mercedes Nagyvaradi (HUN)	3-0 (11–3, 11–2, 11-5)	Jolie Mafuta Ivoso (CGO)	Table 3

==== Group FF ====
Athlete	Pld	W	L	MW	ML
Celine Pang (FRA)	3	3	0	9	2
Katsiaryna Baravok (BLR)	3	2	1	8	4
Lily Phan (AUS)	3	1	2	4	6
Adielle Rosheuvel (GUY)	3	0	3	0	9

21 August
18:30
Celine Pang (FRA)	3-0 (11–5, 11–4, 11-6)	Adielle Rosheuvel (GUY)	Table 2
18:30
Katsiaryna Baravok (BLR)	3-1 (11–7, 8-11, 11–4, 11-4)	Lily Phan (AUS)	Table 5
22 August
10:30
Celine Pang (FRA)	3-2 (11–9, 8-11, 5-11, 11–3, 11-8)	Katsiaryna Baravok (BLR)	Table 1
10:30
Adielle Rosheuvel (GUY)	0-3 (5-11, 5-11, 6-11)	Lily Phan (AUS)	Table 4
12:30
Celine Pang (FRA)	3-0 (11–7, 12–10, 12-10)	Lily Phan (AUS)	Table 1
12:30
Katsiaryna Baravok (BLR)	3-0 (11–4, 11–2, 11-4)	Adielle Rosheuvel (GUY)	Table 4

==== Group GG ====
Athlete	Pld	W	L	MW	ML
Hsin Huang (TPE)	3	3	0	9	1
Alex Galic (SLO)	3	2	1	7	4
Nuwani Vithanage (SRI)	3	1	2	4	6
Julia Wu (NZL)	3	0	3	0	9

21 August
18:30
Hsin Huang (TPE)	3-0 (11–4, 11–5, 11-4)	Julia Wu (NZL)	Table 1
18:30
Alex Galic (SLO)	3-1 (11–6, 5-11, 11–8, 11-8)	Nuwani Vithanage (SRI)	Table 8
22 August
10:30
Hsin Huang (TPE)	3-1 (11–7, 11–3, 11-13, 11-9)	Alex Galic (SLO)	Table 5
10:30
Julia Wu (NZL)	0-3 (7-11, 8-11, 8-11)	Nuwani Vithanage (SRI)	Table 6
12:30
Hsin Huang (TPE)	3-0 (11–1, 11–5, 14-12)	Nuwani Vithanage (SRI)	Table 6
12:30
Alex Galic (SLO)	3-0 (11–2, 11–5, 11-7)	Julia Wu (NZL)	Table 2

==== Group HH ====
Athlete	Pld	W	L	MW	ML
Alice Loveridge (GBR)	3	3	0	9	1
Carelyn Cordero (PUR)	3	1	2	6	6
Letizia Giardi (SMR)	3	1	2	3	6
Islem Laid (ALG)	3	1	2	3	8

21 August
18:30
Alice Loveridge (GBR)	3-0 (11–8, 11–8, 12-10)	Islem Laid (ALG)	Table 7
18:30
Carelyn Cordero (PUR)	3-0 (11–7, 11–4, 11-9)	Letizia Giardi (SMR)	Table 4
22 August
10:30
Alice Loveridge (GBR)	3-1 (8-11, 11–9, 11–7, 15-13)	Carelyn Cordero (PUR)	Table 2
10:30
Islem Laid (ALG)	0-3 (w/o)	Letizia Giardi (SMR)	Table 7
12:30
Alice Loveridge (GBR)	3-0 (11–6, 11–5, 11-8)	Letizia Giardi (SMR)	Table 5
12:30
Carelyn Cordero (PUR)	2-3 (7-11, 11–5, 11-9, 8-11, 9-11)	Islem Laid (ALG)	Table 7

== Knockout stage ==
Quarterfinals
Bernadette Szocs (ROU)	8	11	5	8	7
Isabelle Siyun Li (SIN)	11	5	11	11	11
Ayuka Tanioka (JPN)	7	4	10	8
Suthasini Sawettabut (THA)	11	11	12	11
Yuting Gu (CHN)	13	10	11	8	8	11	11
Song I Kim (PRK)	11	12	8	11	11	7	6
Olga Bliznet (MDA)	5	9	8	11
Yang Ha-eun (KOR)	11	11	11	13

Semifinals
Isabelle Siyun Li (SIN)	11	11	11	11
Suthasini Sawettabut (THA)	9	6	6	9
Gu Yuting (CHN)	11	11	11	7	11
Yang Ha-eun (KOR)	8	7	7	11	2

Final
Isabelle Siyun Li (SIN)	8	5	8	9
Yuting Gu (CHN)	11	11	11	11
Bronze-medal match
Suthasini Sawettabut (THA)	11	5	4	7	6
Yang Ha-eun (KOR)	9	11	11	11	11
