= Swimming at the 2010 Summer Youth Olympics – Boys' 200 metre butterfly =

The men's 200 metre butterfly heats and final at the 2010 Youth Olympic Games took place on August 20 at the Singapore Sports School.

== Medalists ==
Gold	Bence Biczó; Hungary	1:55.89
Silver	Chad le Clos; South Africa	1:56.85
Bronze	Marcin Cieślak; Poland	1:57.68

== Heats ==
=== Heat 1 ===
Rank	Lane	Name	Nationality	Time	Notes
1	4	Bence Biczó	Hungary	1:58.63	Q
2	5	Chang Gyu-cheol	South Korea	2:02.50	Q
3	3	Thomas Jobin	Canada	2:04.72	
4	2	Joel Romeu	Uruguay	2:06.02	
5	6	Melvin Herrmann	Germany	2:06.83	
6	1	Homayoun Haghighijadid	Iran	2:09.45	
7	7	Arnoscy Siahaan	Indonesia	2:09.46	

=== Heat 2 ===
Rank	Lane	Name	Nationality	Time	Notes
1	3	Jordan Coelho	France	2:00.37	Q
2	4	Chad le Clos	South Africa	2:02.07	Q
3	5	Zsombor Szana	Hungary	2:02.51	Q
4	6	Ilya Lemaev	Russia	2:04.16	
5	2	Jessie Lacuna	Philippines	2:06.38	
6	1	Zlatko Alić	Bosnia and Herzegovina	2:08.71	
	7	Alessio Torlai	Italy		DNS
	8	Benjamin Gabbard	American Samoa		DNS

=== Heat 3 ===
Rank	Lane	Name	Nationality	Time	Notes
1	4	Marcin Cieślak	Poland	2:01.69	Q
2	3	Kyle McIntee	Canada	2:01.93	Q
3	2	Velimir Stjepanović	Serbia	2:02.04	Q
4	7	Jakub Maly	Austria	2:04.16	
5	6	Jun Isaji	Japan	2:04.13	
6	1	Erich Peske	United States	2:05.09	
7	5	Yoo Kyusang	South Korea	2:08.28	
8	8	Sofyan El Gadi	Libya	2:21.66	NR

== Final ==
Rank	Lane	Name	Nationality	Time	Notes
1st place, gold medalist(s)	4	Bence Biczó	Hungary	1:55.89	
2nd place, silver medalist(s)	7	Chad le Clos	South Africa	1:56.85	
3rd place, bronze medalist(s)	3	Marcin Cieślak	Poland	1:57.68	
4	5	Jordan Coelho	France	1:59.18	
5	1	Chang Gyu-cheol	South Korea	1:59.35	
6	6	Kyle McIntee	Canada	2:01.20	
7	8	Zsombor Szana	Hungary	2:01.52	
8	2	Velimir Stjepanović	Serbia	2:03.27	
