= Romania at the 2010 Summer Youth Olympics =

- IOC code: ROU
- NOC: Romanian Olympic and Sports Committee
- Website: www.cosr.ro

in Singapore
- Competitors: 30 in 12 sports
- Flag bearer: Alina Rotaru
- Medals Ranked 34th: Gold 1 Silver 4 Bronze 2 Total 7

Summer Youth Olympics appearances
- 2010; 2014; 2018; 2026

Romania participated in the 2010 Summer Youth Olympics in Singapore.

The Romanian squad consisted of 30 athletes competing in 12 sports: aquatics (swimming), athletics, boxing, canoeing, fencing, gymnastics, judo, rowing, shooting, table tennis, tennis and weightlifting.

== Medalists ==
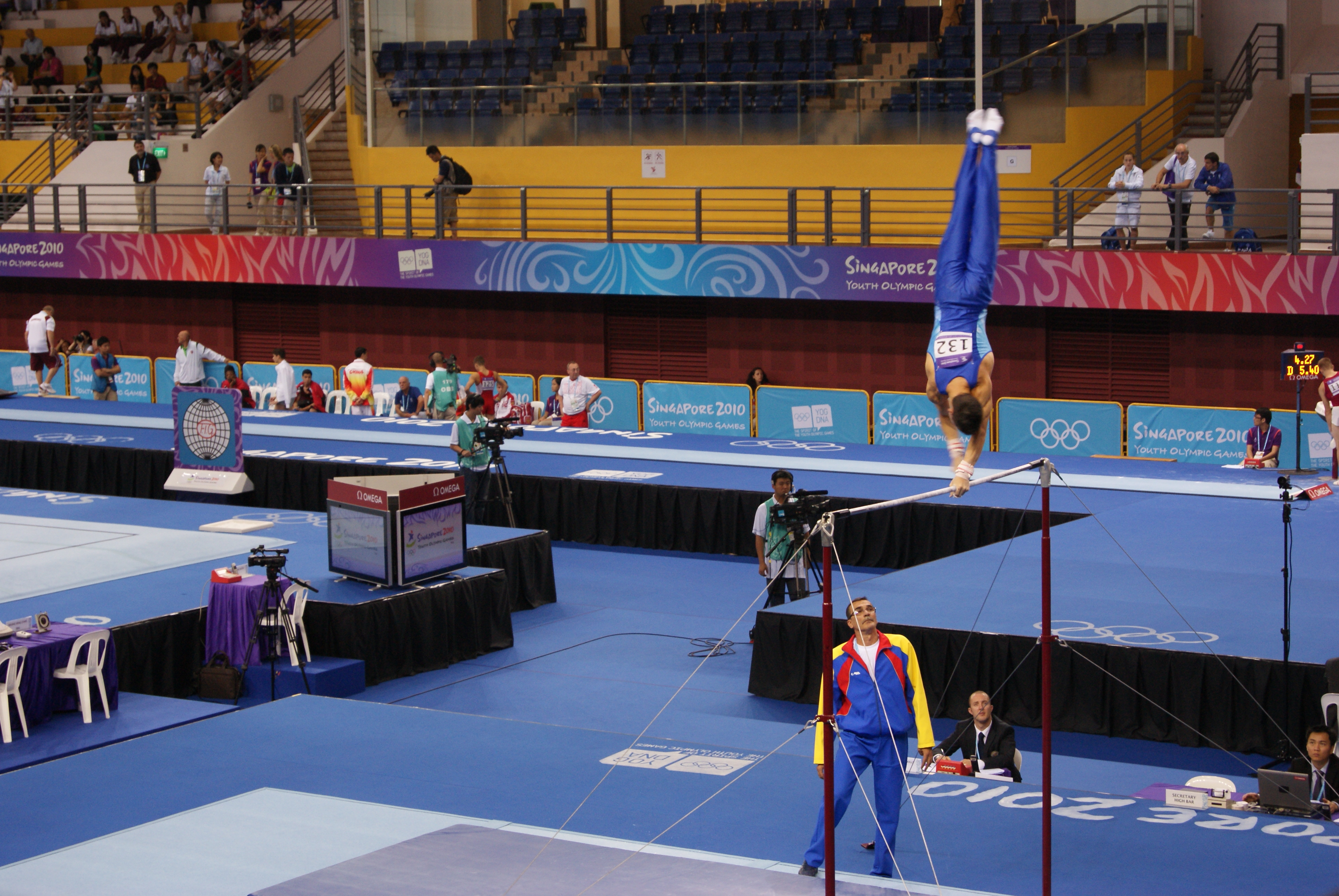
Gymnast Andrei Muntean performing on the horizontal bar during the artistic gymnastics competition on 16 August 2010 at Bishan Sports Hall, Singapore

Medal	Name	Sport	Event	Date
Gold	Andrei Muntean	Gymnastics	Men's rings	21 Aug
Silver	Alina Rotaru	Athletics	Girls' long jump	21 Aug
Silver	Bianca Razor	Athletics	Girls' 400m	21 Aug
Silver	Andrei Muntean	Gymnastics	Men's parallel bars	22 Aug
Silver	Diana Bulimar	Gymnastics	Women's floor	22 Aug
Bronze	Ioan Prundeanu	Rowing	Junior men's single sculls	18 Aug
Bronze	Razvan Tudosie	Swimming	Youth men's 50m breaststroke	20 Aug
Bronze	Bianca Razor	Athletics	Girls' medley relay	23 Aug
Bronze	Ioan Visan	Judo	Mixed team	25 Aug

== Athletics ==
=== Boys ===
Track and Road Events

Athletes	Event	Qualification		Final	
Athletes	Event	Result	Rank	Result	Rank
Claudiu Cimpoeru	Boys' 3000m	8:30.84	12 Q	8:32.85	10
Laurentiu Rosu	Boys' 2000m steeplechase	6:12.77	10 qB	6:25.15	13

=== Girls ===
Track and road events

Athletes	Event	Qualification		Final	
Athletes	Event	Result	Rank	Result	Rank
Ana Rosianu	Girls' 100m	12.69	16 qC	12.53	16
Bianca Răzor	Girls' 400m	53.89	3 Q	53.10	Silver medal
Monica Florea	Girls' 3000m	9:39.00	3 Q	9:38.64	5
Dana Loghin	Girls' 2000m steeplechase	7:26.53	13 qB	7:08.51	12
Annie Tagoe (GBR); Anna Bongiorni (ITA); Sonja Mosler (GER); Bianca Răzor (ROU)	Girls' medley relay			2:07.59	Bronze medal

Field events

Athletes	Event	Qualification		Final	
Athletes	Event	Result	Rank	Result	Rank
Bianca Lazar Fazecas	Girls' hammer throw	55.06	7 Q	51.28	6
Alina Rotaru	Girls' long jump	6.40	1 Q	6.38	Silver medal

== Boxing ==
Boys

Athlete	Event	Preliminaries	Semifinals	Final	Rank
Alexandru Marin	Bantamweight (54 kg)	Dawid Michelus (POL); L 0-4	Did not advance	5th Place Bout; Stan Nicette (SEY); W RSC R3 2:30	5

== Canoeing ==
Boys

Athlete	Event	Time trial		Round 1	Round 2 (Rep)	Round 3	Round 4	Round 5	Final	Rank
Athlete	Event	Time	Rank	Round 1	Round 2 (Rep)	Round 3	Round 4	Round 5	Final	Rank
Andrei Liferi	Boys' C1 slalom	2:02.92	10	Queiroz (BRA); L 2:01.73-1:53.23	Babayan (ARM); W 2:00.19-2:06.94	Melnyk (UKR); L 1:56.69-1:45.61	Wang (CHN); L 2:07.68-1:36.07	Did not advance		7
Andrei Liferi	Boys' C1 sprint	1:47.74	7	Burisa (CRO); W 1:50.58-1:59.78		Yemelyanov (KAZ); W 1:48.22-1:48.55	Yemelyanov (KAZ); W 1:54.80-DNF	Cardenas (CUB); L 2:02.06-1:48.43	Casteaneda (MEX); L 1:54.24-1:53.45	4

== Fencing ==
Group stage

Athlete	Event	Match 1	Match 2	Match 3	Match 4	Match 5	Match 6	Seed
Lucian Ciovica	Boys' épée	Julian Godoy (CRC); W 5-2	Lyssov (CAN); L 2-5	Lim (SIN); W 5-4	Bodoczi (GER); W 5-0	Novotny (CZE); L 3-5	Na (KOR); L 1-5	9
Dragos Sirbu	Boys' sabre	Hübers (GER); L 4-5	Zatko (FRA); W 5-2	Akula (BLR); L 2-5	Wang (HKG); W 5-4	Elsissy (EGY); L 2-5	Kondo (NIG); W 5-0	8
Amalia Tătăran	Girls' épée	Matshaya (RSA); W 5-3	Bakhareva (RUS); L 3-5	Lee (KOR); L 2-5	Radford (GBR); W 5-4	Tella (ARG); W 5-1		6

Knock-out stage

Athlete	Event	Round of 16	Quarterfinals	Semifinals	Final	Rank
Lucian Ciovica	Boys' épée	Saleh (EGY); W 15-5	Fichera (ITA); L 14-15	Did not advance		7
Dragos Sirbu	Boys' sabre	Mallette (CAN); W 15-8	Hübers (GER); L 10-15	Did not advance		8
Amalia Tătăran	Girls' épée	Matshaya (RSA); W 15-10	Holmes (USA); L 10-15	Did not advance		7
Europe 4 Kenza Boudad (FRA); Lucian Ciovica (ROU); Michala Cellerova (SVK); Arthur Zatko (FRA); Amalia Tătăran (ROU); Alexander Choupenitch (CZE)	Mixed team		Asia-Oceania 1 L 24-30	5th-8th Asia-Oceania 2 W 30-20	5th-6th Europe 3 W 30-29	5

== Gymnastics ==
=== Artistic gymnastics ===
Boys

Athlete	Event	Floor		Pommel horse		Rings		Vault		Parallel bars		Horizontal bar		Total	
Athlete	Event	Score	Rank	Score	Rank	Score	Rank	Score	Rank	Score	Rank	Score	Rank	Score	Rank
Andrei Muntean	Boys' qualification	13.950	10	13.650	6 Q	14.700	1 Q	15.700	7	14.400	2 Q	11.400	39	83.800	6 Q
Andrei Muntean	Boys' individual all-around	14.000	6	12.950	12	14.650	1	15.800	1	13.850	6	13.700	5	84.950	4

Athlete	Event	Score	Rank
Andrei Muntean	Boys' pommel horse	13.050	8
Andrei Muntean	Boys' rings	14.350	Gold medal
Andrei Muntean	Boys' parallel bars	14.150	Silver medal

Girls

Athlete	Event	Vault		Uneven Bars		Beam		floor		Total	
Athlete	Event	Score	Rank	Score	Rank	Score	Rank	Score	Rank	Score	Rank
Diana Bulimar	Girls' qualification	13.750	7 Q	13.850	3 Q	13.150	15	13.950	3 Q	54.700	4 Q
Diana Bulimar	Girls' individual all-around	13.650	8	12.700	11	13.900	6	13.700	4	53.950	6

Athlete	Event	Score	Rank
Diana Bulimar	Girls' vault	13.412	7
Diana Bulimar	Girls' uneven bars	12.525	7
Diana Bulimar	Girls' floor	14.325	Silver medal

== Judo ==
Individual

Athlete	Event	Round 1	Round 2	Round 3	Round 4	Semifinals	Final	Rank
Athlete	Event	Opposition Result	Opposition Result	Opposition Result	Opposition Result	Opposition Result	Opposition Result	Rank
Ioan Visan	Boys' -66 kg	BYE	Machado (BRA); W 100-000	Otgonbayar (MGL); L 000-001	Repechage; Cisse (SEN); W 100-000	Repechage; Tugushi (GEO); L 000-100	Did not advance	7
Alexandra Pop	Girls' -52 kg	Guica (CAN); W 101-011	Bouyssou (USA); L 000-020	Repechage; Rasinska (POL); L 000-021	Did not advance			9

Team

Team	Event	Round 1	Round 2	Semifinals	Final	Rank
Team	Event	Opposition Result	Opposition Result	Opposition Result	Opposition Result	Rank
Cairo; Neha Thakur (IND); Mansurkhuja Muminkhujaev (UZB); Christine Huck (AUT); Ioan Visan (ROU); Andrea Guillen (CRC); Eldin Omerovic (BIH); Barbara Matić (CRO); Pedro Pineda (VEN)	Mixed Team	Birmingham; W 5-2	Hamilton; W 4-4 (3-2)	Essen; L 2-5	Did not advance	Bronze medal
Chiba; Dieulourdes Joseph (HAI); Diau Bauro (FIJ); Alexandra Pop (ROU); Phuc Cai (DEN); Sophio Beridze (GEO); Rijad Dedeic (MNE); Ryosuke Igarashi (JPN)	Mixed Team	BYE	Essen; L 2-5	Did not advance		5

== Rowing ==
Athlete	Event	Heats		Repechage		Semifinals		Final		Overall rank
Athlete	Event	Time	Rank	Time	Rank	Time	Rank	Time	Rank	Overall rank
Ioan Prundeanu	Boys' single sculls	3:22.59	1 QA/B			3:25.16	2 QA	3:19.11	3	Bronze medal
Ana Gigica; Madalina Buzdugan	Girls' pair	3:35.80	1 QA/B			3:40.67	2 QA	3:37.32	5	5

== Shooting ==
Pistol

Athlete	Event	Qualification		Final		
Athlete	Event	Score	Rank	Score	Total	Rank
Stefan Rares Ion	Boys' 10m air pistol	564	9	Did not advance		
Alexandra Silvia Morar	Girls' 10m air pistol	370	10	Did not advance		

== Swimming ==
Athletes	Event	Heat		Semifinal		Final	
Athletes	Event	Time	Position	Time	Position	Time	Position
Marius Radu	Boys' 50m freestyle	23.53	8 Q	23.50	10	Did not advance	
Marius Radu	Boys' 100m freestyle	51.61	9 Q	50.88	6 Q	50.76	6
Razvan Tudosie	Boys' 50m breaststroke	28.74	1 Q	28.92	3 Q	28.69	Bronze medal
Razvan Tudosie	Boys' 100m breaststroke	1:04.82	12 Q	1:04.84	11	Did not advance	
Carina Macavei	Girls' 100m backstroke	1:06.27	22	Did not advance			
Alexandra Dobrin	Girls' 100m backstroke	1:06.31	25	Did not advance			
Alexandra Dobrin	Girls' 200m backstroke	2:22.90	23			Did not advance	

== Table tennis ==
Individual

Athlete	Event	Round 1		Round 2		Quarterfinals	Semifinals	Final	Rank
Athlete	Event	Group Matches	Rank	Group Matches	Rank	Quarterfinals	Semifinals	Final	Rank
Bernadette Szocs	Girls' singles	Baravok (BLR); W 3-1 (9-11, 11-8, 11-9, 11-8)	2 Q	Ng (HKG); L 0-3 (5-11, 8-11, 4-11)	1 Q	Li (SIN); L 1-4 (8-11, 11-5, 5-11, 8-11, 7-11)	Did not advance		5
Bernadette Szocs	Girls' singles	Eerland (NED); L 1-3 (11-8, 7-11, 7-11, 9-11)	2 Q	Xiao (POR); W 3-2 (14-12, 6-11, 3-11 11-3, 11-5)	1 Q	Li (SIN); L 1-4 (8-11, 11-5, 5-11, 8-11, 7-11)	Did not advance		5
Bernadette Szocs	Girls' singles	Giardi (SMR); W 3-0 (11-4, 11-5, 11-3)	2 Q	Kim (PRK); W 3-0 (11-9, 11-8, 11-8)	1 Q	Li (SIN); L 1-4 (8-11, 11-5, 5-11, 8-11, 7-11)	Did not advance		5

Team

Athlete	Event	Round 1		Round 2	Quarterfinals	Semifinals	Final	Rank
Athlete	Event	Group matches	Rank	Round 2	Quarterfinals	Semifinals	Final	Rank
Europe 1 Bernadette Szocs (ROU); Hampus Soderlund (SWE)	Mixed Team	Europe 4 Bliznet (MDA); Kulpa (POL); W 2-1 (3-0, 1-3, 3-1)	1 Q	Brazil; Kumahara (BRA); Jouti (BRA); W 2-0 (3-1, 3-1)	DPR Korea; Kim (PRK); Kim (PRK); L 1-2 (2-3, 3-0, 2-3)	Did not advance		5
Europe 1 Bernadette Szocs (ROU); Hampus Soderlund (SWE)	Mixed Team	Europe 3 Loveridge (GBR); Mutti (ITA); W 2-1 (3-0, 2-3, 3-1)	1 Q	Brazil; Kumahara (BRA); Jouti (BRA); W 2-0 (3-1, 3-1)	DPR Korea; Kim (PRK); Kim (PRK); L 1-2 (2-3, 3-0, 2-3)	Did not advance		5
Europe 1 Bernadette Szocs (ROU); Hampus Soderlund (SWE)	Mixed Team	Africa 2 Ivoso (CGO); Kam (MRI); W 3-0 (3-0, 3-1, 3-0)	1 Q	Brazil; Kumahara (BRA); Jouti (BRA); W 2-0 (3-1, 3-1)	DPR Korea; Kim (PRK); Kim (PRK); L 1-2 (2-3, 3-0, 2-3)	Did not advance		5

== Tennis ==
Singles

Athlete	Event	Round 1	Round 2	Quarterfinals	Semifinals	Final	Rank
Cristina Dinu	Girls' singles	Royg (PAR); W 2-0 (7-5, 6-3)	Tang (CHN); L 1-2 (6-7, 6-2, 2-6)	Did not advance			

Doubles

Athlete	Event	Round 1	Quarterfinals	Semifinals	Final	Rank
Cristina Dinu (ROU); Ons Jabeur (TUN)	Girls' doubles	Allertova (CZE); Radulovic (MNE); W 2-1 (7-5, 3-6, [10-1])	Tang (CHN); Zheng (CHN); L 0-2 (2-6, 3-6)	Did not advance		

== Weightlifting ==
Athlete	Event	Snatch	Clean & Jerk	Total	Rank
Florin Croitoru	Boys' 56 kg	103	122	225	5
Andreea Aanei	Girls' +63 kg	102	125	227	5
