= Gymnastics at the 2010 Summer Youth Olympics – Men's horizontal bar =

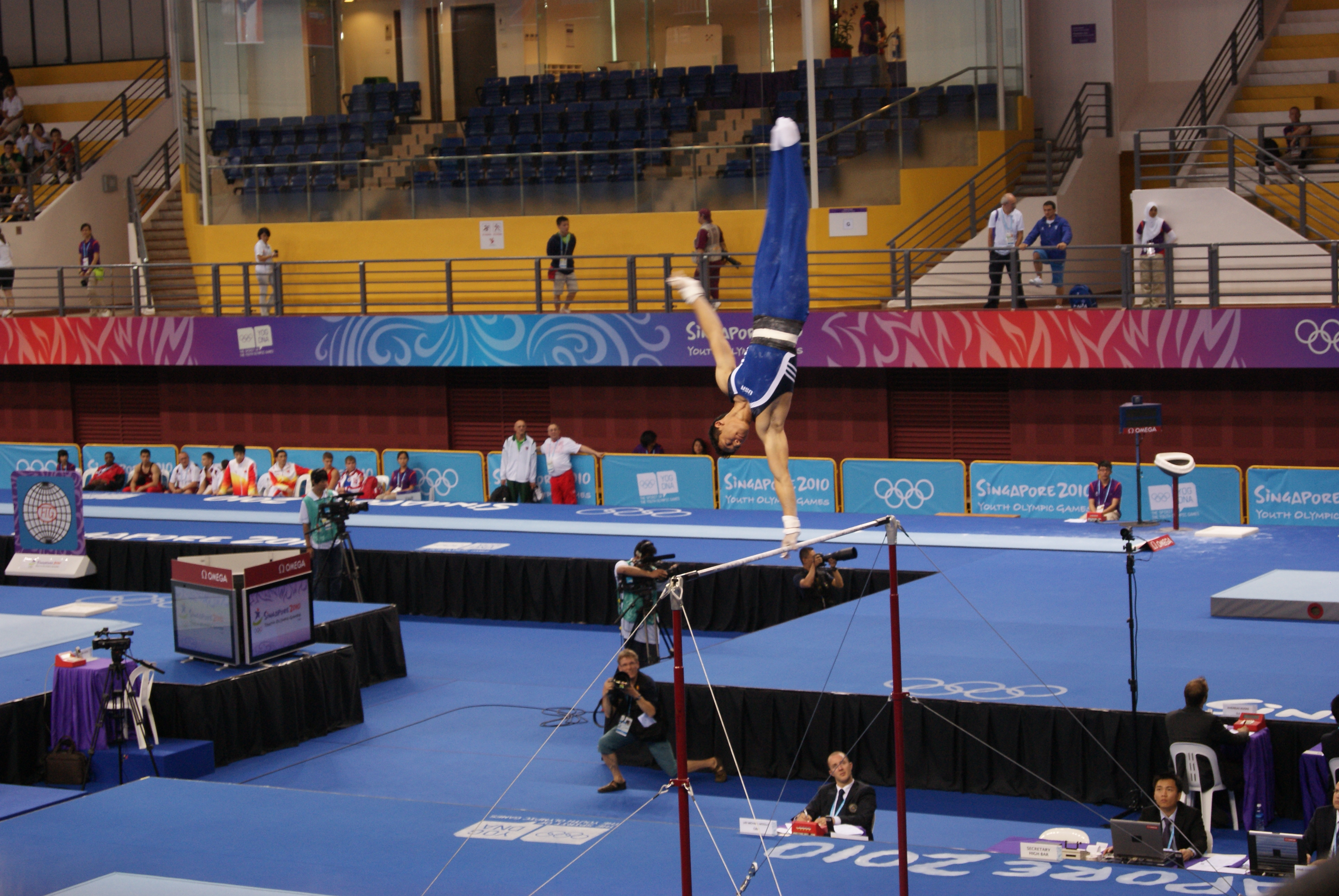
American gymnast Jesse Glenn performing on the horizontal bar during the 2010 Summer Youth Olympics

These are the results of the men's horizontal bar competition, one of seven events for male competitors of the artistic gymnastics discipline contested in the gymnastics at the 2010 Summer Youth Olympics in Singapore. The qualification and final rounds took place on 16 August at the Bishan Sports Hall.

== Medalists ==
Gold	Silver	Bronze
Sam Oldham; Great Britain	Néstor Abad; Spain	Zhu Xiaodong; China

== Results ==
=== Qualification ===
41 gymnasts competed in the floor exercise event in the artistic gymnastics qualification round on August 16. The eight highest scoring gymnasts advanced to the final on August 22.

=== Final ===
Rank	Gymnast	A-score	B-score	Penalty	Total
Gold medal	Sam Oldham (GBR)	5.1	9.275	—	14.375
Silver medal	Néstor Abad (ESP)	5.0	9.125	—	14.125
Bronze medal	Zhu Xiaodong (CHN)	5.1	9.000	—	14.100
4	Yuya Kamoto (JPN)	5.2	8.875	—	14.075
5	Daniil Kazachkov (RUS)	5.1	8.925	—	14.025
6	Ernesto Vila Sarria (CUB)	5.1	8.875	—	13.975
7	Robert Tvorogal (LTU)	5.0	8.925	—	13.925
8	Brody-Jai Hennessy (AUS)	4.5	7.200	—	11.700
