= Gymnastics at the 2010 Summer Youth Olympics – Men's pommel horse =

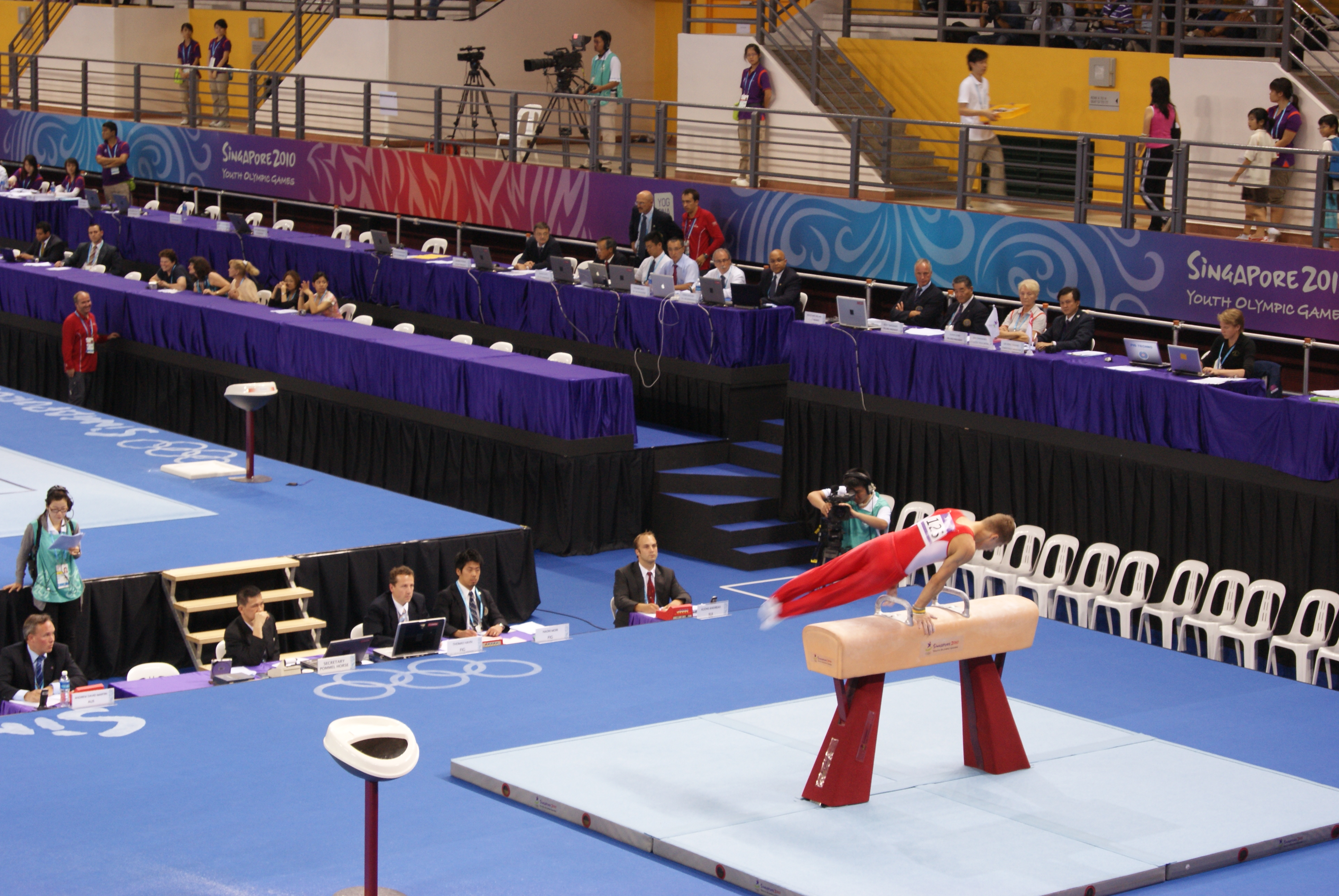
Lithuanian gymnast Robertas Tvorogalas on the pommel horse during the 2010 Summer Youth Olympics

These are the results of the men's pommel horse competition, one of seven events for male competitors of the artistic gymnastics discipline contested in the gymnastics at the 2010 Summer Youth Olympics in Singapore. The qualification and final rounds took place on 16 August at the Bishan Sports Hall.

== Medalists ==
Gold	Silver	Bronze
Oleg Stepko; Ukraine	Sam Oldham; Great Britain	Daniil Kazachkov; Russia

== Results ==
=== Qualification ===
41 gymnasts competed in the floor exercise event in the artistic gymnastics qualification round on August 16. The eight highest scoring gymnasts advanced to the final on August 21.

=== Final ===
Rank	Gymnast	A-score	B-score	Penalty	Total
Gold medal	Oleg Stepko (UKR)	5.1	8.850	—	13.950
Silver medal	Sam Oldham (GBR)	4.9	9.025	—	13.925
Bronze medal	Daniil Kazachkov (RUS)	4.5	9.050	—	13.550
4	Vasili Mikhalitsyn (BLR)	4.6	8.850	—	13.450
5	Levente Vagner (HUN)	5.2	8.225	—	13.425
6	Yuya Kamoto (JPN)	4.5	8.825	—	13.325
7	Nikolaos Iliopoulos (GRE)	5.1	8.100	—	13.200
8	Andrei Muntean (ROU)	4.6	8.450	—	13.050
