= Sam Oldham =

British artistic gymnast

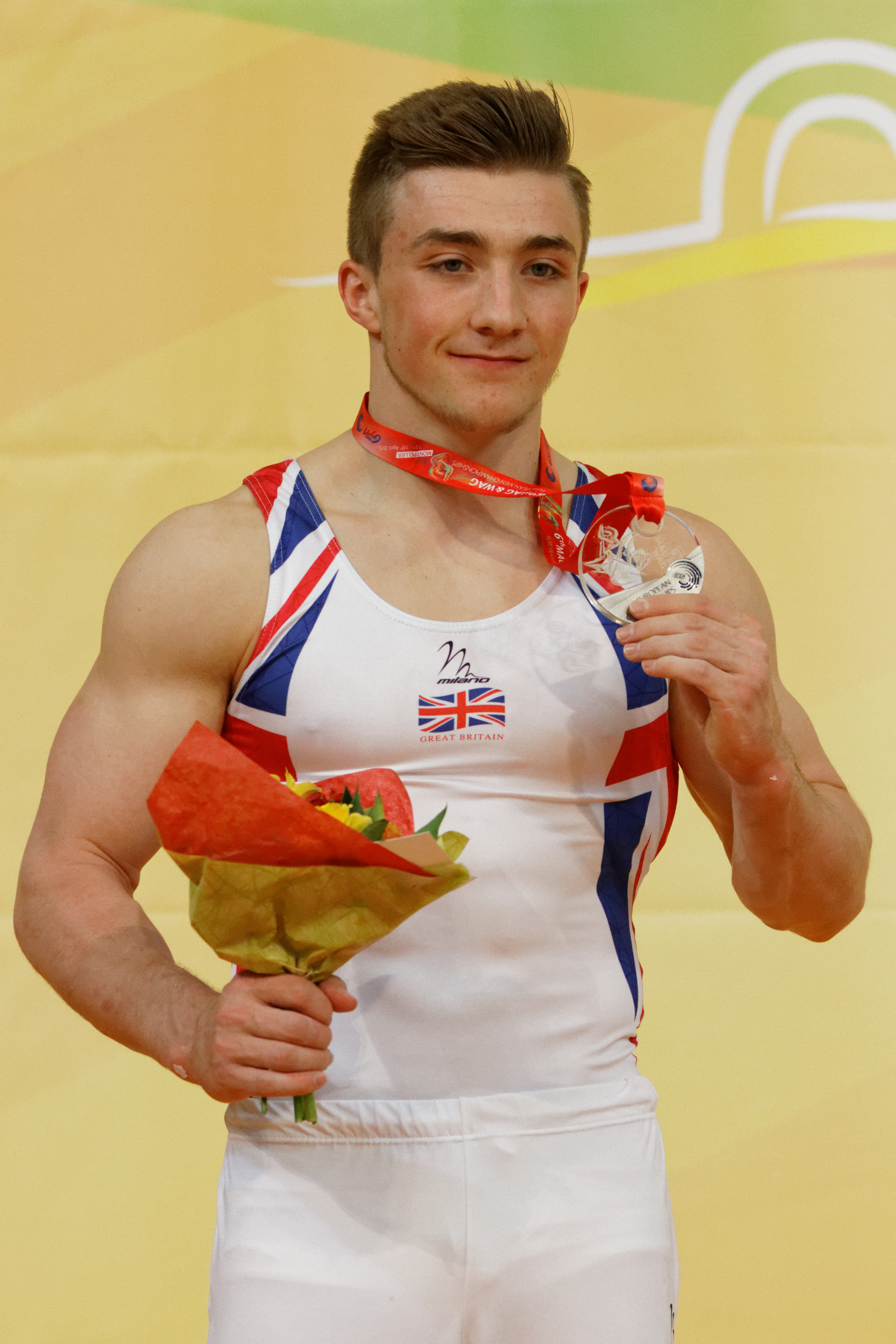
- Sam Oldham with his silver medal from the 2015 European Championships

Personal information
- Full name: Sam Joshua Oldham
- Born: 17 February 1993 (age 33)
- Height: 5 ft 6 in (168 cm)

Gymnastics career
- Discipline: Men's artistic gymnastics
- Country represented: (United Kingdom) Great Britain; England
- Club: Notts Gymnastics Academy
- Retired: 14 September 2021
Medal record
Men's artistic gymnastics
Representing Great Britain
Olympic Games
Bronze medal – third place	2012 London	Team
European Championships
Silver medal – second place	2013 Moscow	Horizontal Bar
Silver medal – second place	2014 Sofia	Team
Silver medal – second place	2014 Sofia	Horizontal Bar
Silver medal – second place	2015 Montpellier	Horizontal Bar
Youth Olympic Games
Gold medal – first place	2010 Singapore	Horizontal Bar
Silver medal – second place	2010 Singapore	Pommel Horse
Representing England
Commonwealth Games
Gold medal – first place	2014 Glasgow	Team

Sam Joshua Oldham (born 17 February 1993) is a retired English artistic gymnast who represented Great Britain in Olympic, World and European competition. He was part of the British men's team at the 2012 Summer Olympics that won bronze in the team competition. He is also a three-time junior European champion and won individual horizontal bar gold at the 2010 Summer Youth Olympics in Singapore.

Representing England, he was a member of the gold medal-winning men's team at the 2014 Commonwealth Games in Glasgow.

== Early life and education ==
Sam Oldham was born on 17 February 1993 to Bob and Dawn Oldham. Oldham currently lives in Keyworth, Nottinghamshire, England with his parents and three siblings.

Sam's first school was Crossdale Drive Primary School in Keyworth. Oldham then attended Rushcliffe School in West Bridgford before leaving the institution at 14 to be home-taught so he could focus on training.

Oldham first started in gymnastics at the age of seven on the recommendation of his teacher, but was also a talented footballer. Oldham played in the Notts County F.C. Centre of Excellence as a forward until the club closed it down. Despite receiving offers from Nottingham Forest F.C. and Derby County F.C., Oldham chose to focus on gymnastics. Oldham's father and grandfather were both footballers, and his younger brother currently plays in the Nottingham Forest youth setup.

== Gymnastics career ==
=== Junior career ===
Oldham left Rushcliffe School and moved to Huntingdon at the age of 14 to train with the 2008 Summer Olympics-bound gymnasts, where he lodged with the family of fellow gymnast, Cameron MacKenzie. His other training partners included eventual pommel horse bronze medallist Louis Smith. Smith later thanked Oldham for being his training partner leading up to Beijing.

At the European Gymnastics Championships in Lausanne, Switzerland in 2008, where he was the youngest member of the British team, Oldham broke his wrist during his floor routine. However, he managed to complete his routine one-handed and helped the British team to gold in the junior team event. Late in 2008, a Castle Donington-based company agreed to sponsor Oldham up to the 2012 Summer Olympics.

Oldham was named to the British team for the 2009 Australian Youth Olympic Festival, where he won team gold. Later that year, he was selected to be in the British delegation to the European Youth Olympic Festival in Tampere, Finland, where he won two golds in the pommel horse and parallel bars events. Oldham was named BBC East Midlands' Junior Sports Personality of the Year in 2009 for his performances in Tampere and for sweeping all seven golds available at the English national championships.

At the 2010 European Gymnastics Championships in Birmingham, England, Oldham won three gold medals, becoming European junior champion in the team all-around, the horizontal bar, and the individual all-around. By winning the individual all-around, Oldham secured qualification to represent Great Britain at the 2010 Summer Youth Olympics in Singapore.

In Singapore, Oldham qualified second overall for the all-around competition and made the finals in four other events – the floor, pommel horse, parallel bars, and horizontal bar.

Oldham was in the silver medal position in the all-around final when he suffered a fall from the horizontal bar, his final apparatus, thus finishing fifth. However, he recovered from the setback to win silver in the pommel horse event, missing out on gold by 0.25 points. Oldham subsequently followed that by winning gold in the horizontal bar event, on the same apparatus in which he had suffered his fall during the all-around competition. Despite going first out of the eight finalists, Oldham's score of 14.375 points held out throughout and was enough for gold.

After the Games, Oldham's coach Paul Hall described Oldham as having a chance of making the British team for the 2012 Summer Olympics in London, while Smith called Oldham is an "amazing talent" and British head gymnastics coach Andre Popov predicted Oldham will "absolutely" become Olympic champion.

Oldham considered trying for the 2010 Commonwealth Games team. However, according to Oldham, this plan was shelved when he was selected to the British senior team for the 2010 World Artistic Gymnastics Championships.

For his performances in 2010, Oldham was shortlisted for the BBC Young Sports Personality of the Year Award, and for Junior Sportsperson of the Year Award at the Nottinghamshire Sports Awards, the latter of which he won.

=== Senior career ===
Oldham was named as Great Britain's reserve gymnast to participate at the 2010 senior world championships in Rotterdam. He was the youngest member of the British men's team. The British team qualified for the final and finished seventh in the team all-around, although Oldham did not ultimately take part in the competition. In 2011, Oldham was included along with Samuel Hunter, Daniel Purvis, Theo Seager, Louis Smith and Kristian Thomas in the British squad travelling to Berlin, Germany for the 2011 European Artistic Gymnastics Championships from 6 to 10 April, again as the youngest member of the delegation representing Great Britain. Oldham qualified as the second reserve for the parallel bars final and in fourth place for the final on the horizontal bar. He came fourth in the horizontal bar final, which was his first major senior final.

Oldham was to have been part of the British squad at the London Prepares series gymnastics Olympic qualifier in January 2012, but missed out after breaking his collarbone before the 2011 World Artistic Gymnastics Championships in October 2011, and further injuring himself during that competition. Without Oldham, the British team secured qualification to the gymnastics events at the 2012 Summer Olympics.

Despite his injury setback, Oldham ended the first year of his senior career by winning all-around silver at the British national championships, which doubled as the final selection trial for the Olympic Games. Oldham attributed his performance, which he said was "better than I could ever have hoped for" and was good enough to see him named to the British squad for the Olympics over Dan Keatings, to the trials being the final chance to impress the Olympic selectors after his injury layoff.

At 19, Oldham was the youngest member to be named to the British team for gymnastics at the 2012 Summer Olympics, which won a bronze medal in the men's team all-around final at the North Greenwich Arena on 30 July.

On 19–25 May 2014, at the 2014 European Championships in Sofia. Oldham along with his teammates (Daniel Keatings, Daniel Purvis, Max Whitlock, Kristian Thomas) won Team Great Britain the silver medal behind Russia with a total score of 262.087 points. In event finals, Oldham won the silver medal in high bar (14.866) behind 2012 Olympic champion Epke Zonderland. Oldham suffered from ankle ligament damage at the Commonwealth Games in July 2014, but returned to competition nine months later. Although he was third overall in the all-around and won the floor exercise in the final trial for the Olympics, he did not make the squad for the 2016 Summer Olympics in Rio de Janeiro.

Following the 2021 Men’s Artistic British Championships, where he won a gold medal on the Horizontal Bar with a score of 13.900, Oldham announced his official retirement from elite gymnastics on 14 September 2021.
