= Julia Wu =

Julia Wu may refer to:

- Julia Wu (table tennis)
- Julia Wu (singer)
