= Gymnastics at the 2010 Summer Youth Olympics – Men's parallel bars =

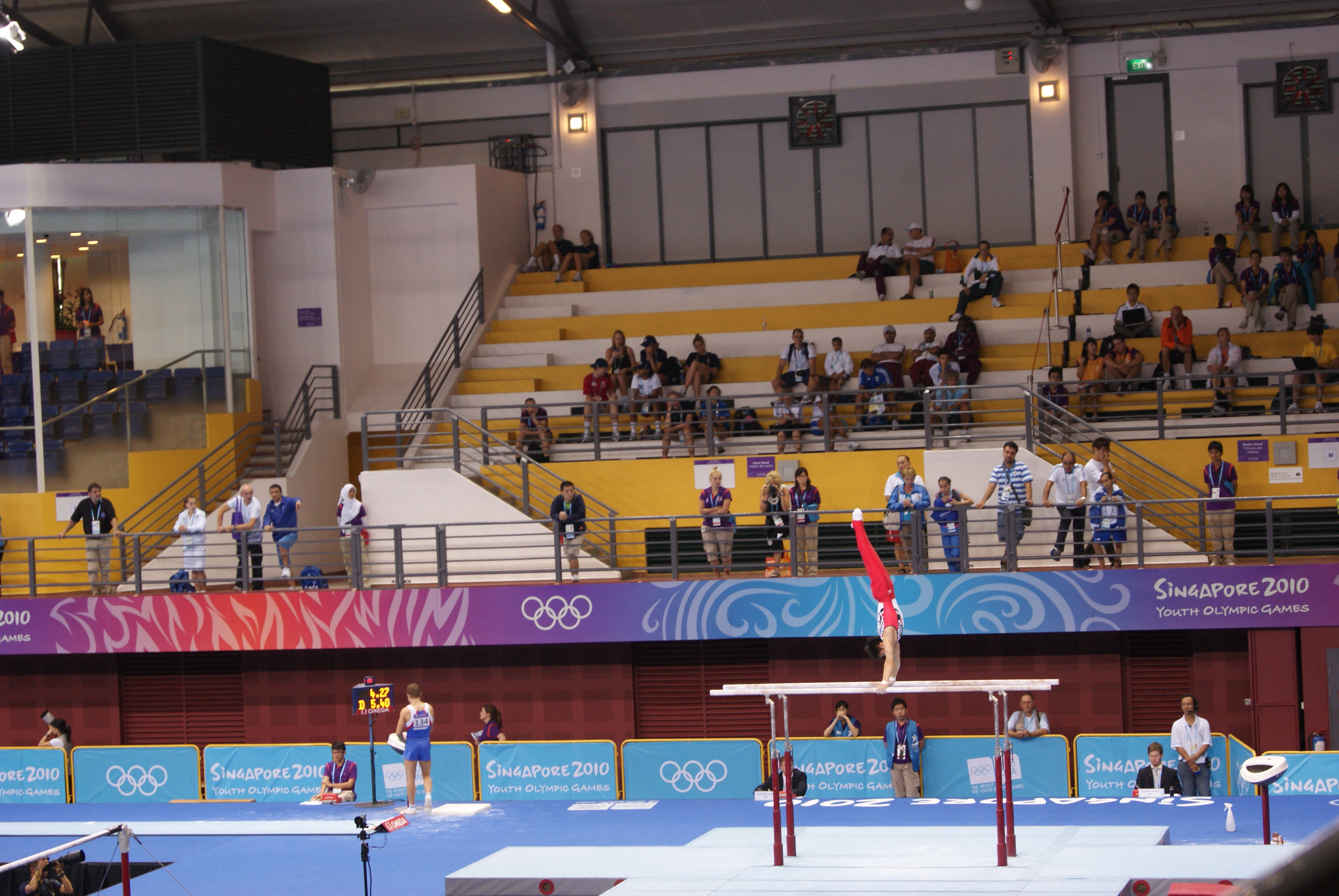
A gymnast performing on the parallel bars during the 2010 Summer Youth Olympics

These are the results of the men's parallel bars competition, one of seven events for male competitors of the artistic gymnastics discipline contested in the gymnastics at the 2010 Summer Youth Olympics in Singapore. The qualification and final rounds took place on 16 August at the Bishan Sports Hall.

== Medalists ==
Gold	Silver	Bronze
Oleg Stepko; Ukraine	Andrei Muntean; Romania	Ludovico Edalli; Italy

== Results ==
=== Qualification ===
41 gymnasts competed in the floor exercise event in the artistic gymnastics qualification round on August 16. The eight highest scoring gymnasts advanced to the final on August 22.

=== Final ===
Rank	Gymnast	A-score	B-score	Penalty	Total
Gold medal	Oleg Stepko (UKR)	5.4	9.000	—	14.400
Silver medal	Andrei Muntean (ROU)	5.6	8.550	—	14.150
Bronze medal	Ludovico Edalli (ITA)	4.9	9.200	—	14.100
4	Sam Oldham (GBR)	5.2	8.800	—	14.000
5	Thomas Neuteleers (BEL)	5.2	8.575	—	13.775
6	Yuya Kamoto (JPN)	4.9	8.850	—	13.750
7	Ernesto Vila Sarria (CUB)	5.2	7.775	—	12.975
8	Daniil Kazachkov (RUS)	4.7	8.200	—	12.900
