= Gymnastics at the 2010 Summer Youth Olympics – Men's rings =

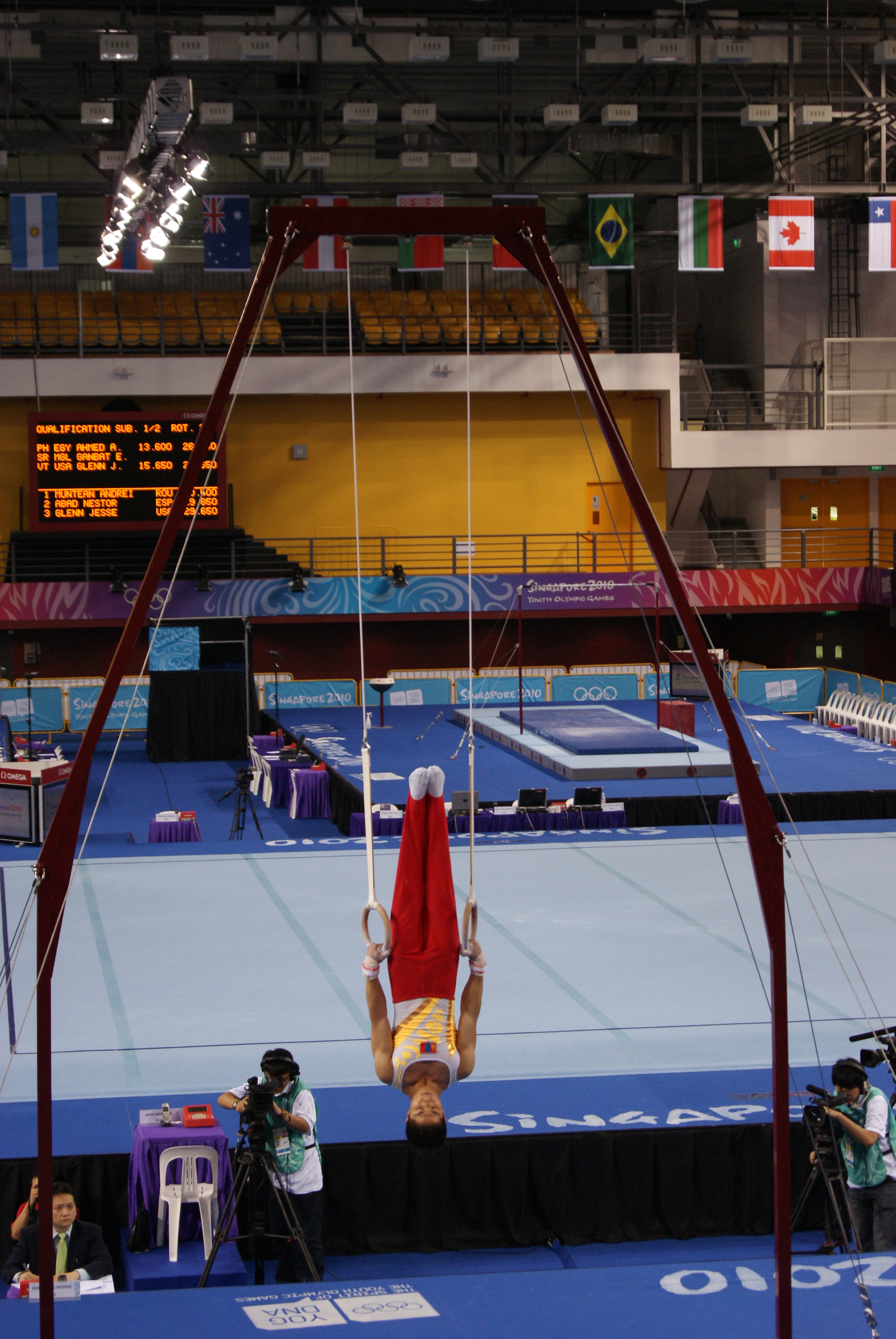
Mongolian gymnast Erdenebold Ganbatyn performing on the rings during the 2010 Summer Youth Olympics

These are the results of the men's rings competition, one of seven events for male competitors of the artistic gymnastics discipline contested in the gymnastics at the 2010 Summer Youth Olympics in Singapore. The qualification and final rounds took place on 16 August at the Bishan Sports Hall.

== Medalists ==
Gold	Silver	Bronze
Andrei Muntean; Romania	Yuya Kamoto; Japan	Néstor Abad; Spain

== Results ==
=== Qualification ===
41 gymnasts competed in the floor exercise event in the artistic gymnastics qualification round on August 16. The eight highest scoring gymnasts advanced to the final on August 21.

=== Final ===
Rank	Gymnast	A-score	B-score	Penalty	Total
Gold medal	Andrei Muntean (ROU)	5.3	9.050	—	14.350
Silver medal	Yuya Kamoto (JPN)	5.2	9.000	—	14.200
Bronze medal	Néstor Abad (ESP)	5.0	9.150	—	14.150
4	Oleg Stepko (UKR)	5.0	8.975	—	13.975
5	Ganbatyn Erdenebold (MGL)	5.5	8.475	—	13.975
6	Daniil Kazachkov (RUS)	4.9	8.925	—	13.825
7	Xiaodong Zhu (CHN)	5.2	8.575	—	13.775
8	Jesse Glenn (USA)	4.9	8.475	—	13.375
