= Guyana at the 2010 Summer Youth Olympics =

- IOC code: GUY
- NOC: Guyana Olympic Association

in Singapore
- Competitors: 4 in 3 sports
- Flag bearer: Jevina Straker
- Medals: Gold 0 Silver 0 Bronze 0 Total 0

Summer Youth Olympics appearances
- 2010; 2014; 2018

Guyana participated at the 2010 Summer Youth Olympics in Singapore.

The Guyana team consisted of 4 athletes competing in 3 sports: athletics, swimming and table tennis.

== Athletics ==
=== Boys ===
Track and Road Events

Athletes	Event	Qualification		Final	
Athletes	Event	Result	Rank	Result	Rank
Chavez Ageday	Boys’ 100m	11.09	13 qB	10.90	12

=== Girls ===
Track and Road Events

Athletes	Event	Qualification		Final	
Athletes	Event	Result	Rank	Result	Rank
Jevina Straker	Girls’ 1000m	3:08.19	19 qB	2:57.41	21

== Swimming ==
Athletes	Event	Heat		Semifinal		Final	
Athletes	Event	Time	Position	Time	Position	Time	Position
Henk Lowe	Boys’ 200m Freestyle	2:23.43	43			Did not advance	
Henk Lowe	Boys’ 400m Freestyle	5:09.04	28			Did not advance	

== Table tennis ==
Individual

Athlete	Event	Round 1		Round 2		Quarterfinals	Semifinals	Final	Rank
Athlete	Event	Group Matches	Rank	Group Matches	Rank	Quarterfinals	Semifinals	Final	Rank
Adielle Rosheuvel	Girls' Singles	Kumahara (BRA); L 0-3 (3-11, 2-11, 6-11)	4 qB	Pang (FRA); L 0-3 (5-11, 4-11, 6-11)	4	Did not advance			29
Adielle Rosheuvel	Girls' Singles	Huang (TPE); L 0-3 (6-11, 4-11, 2-11)	4 qB	Phan (AUS); L 0-3 (5-11, 5-11, 6-11)	4	Did not advance			29
Adielle Rosheuvel	Girls' Singles	Noskova (RUS); L 0-3 (4-11, 4-11, 2-11)	4 qB	Baravok (BLR); L 0-3 (4-11, 2-11, 4-11)	4	Did not advance			29

Team

Athlete	Event	Round 1		Round 2	Quarterfinals	Semifinals	Final	Rank
Athlete	Event	Group Matches	Rank	Round 2	Quarterfinals	Semifinals	Final	Rank
Pan America 3 Adielle Rosheuvel (GUY); Rodrigo Tapia (ECU)	Mixed Team	Netherlands; Eerland (NED); Hageraats (NED); L 0-3 (0-3, 1-3, 0-3)	4 qB	Europe 6 Galic (SLO); Leitgeb (AUT); L 0-2 (0-3, 0-3)	Did not advance			25
Pan America 3 Adielle Rosheuvel (GUY); Rodrigo Tapia (ECU)	Mixed Team	DPR Korea; Kim (PRK); Kim (PRK); L 0-3 (0-3, 0-3, 0-3)	4 qB	Europe 6 Galic (SLO); Leitgeb (AUT); L 0-2 (0-3, 0-3)	Did not advance			25
Pan America 3 Adielle Rosheuvel (GUY); Rodrigo Tapia (ECU)	Mixed Team	Intercontinental 1 Gu (CHN); Hmam (TUN); L 1-2 (0-3, 3-1, 0-3)	4 qB	Europe 6 Galic (SLO); Leitgeb (AUT); L 0-2 (0-3, 0-3)	Did not advance			25
