= Andrei Muntean =

Romanian artistic gymnast

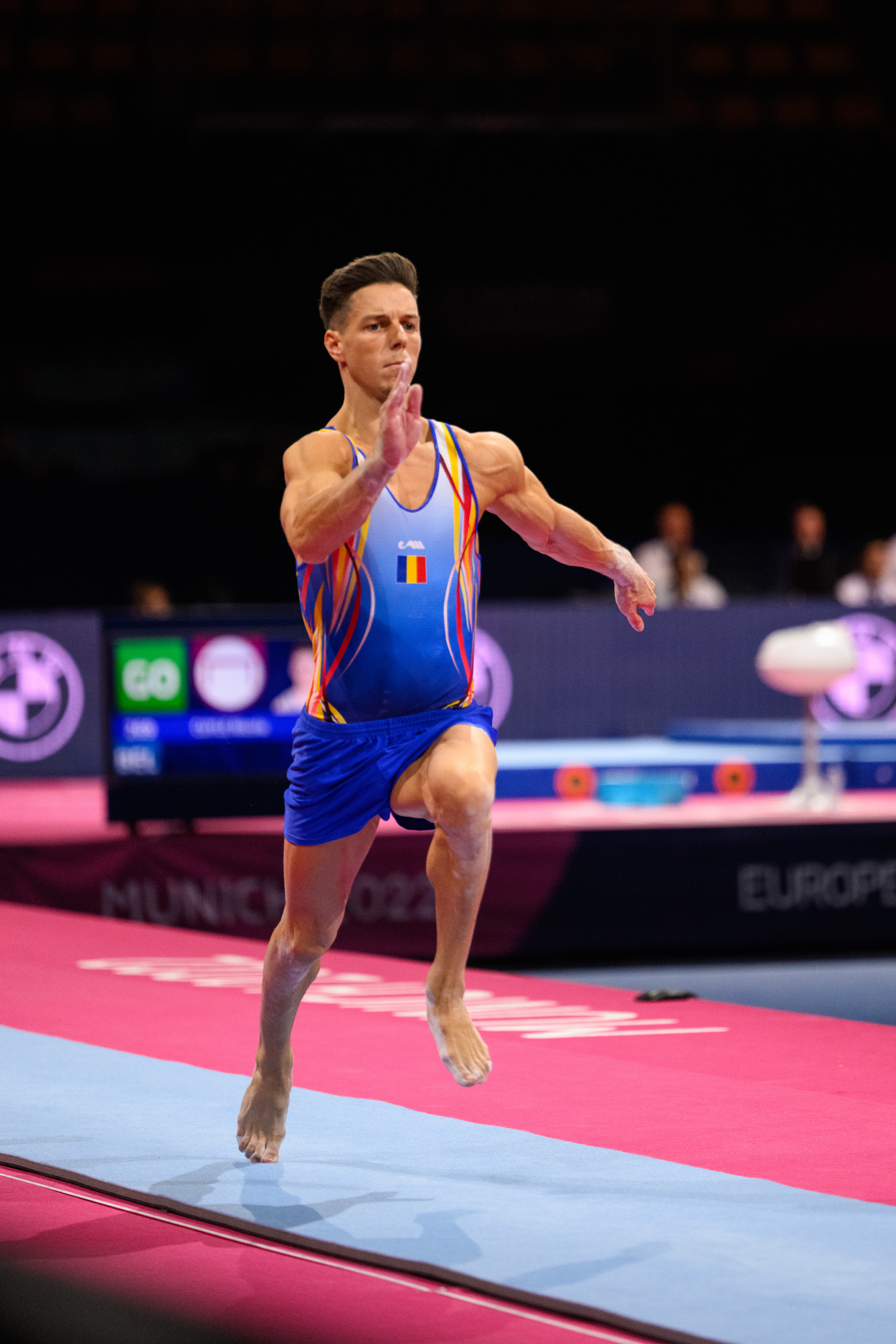
- Muntean at the 2022 European Championships

Personal information
- Full name: Andrei Vasile Muntean
- Born: 30 January 1993 (age 33) Sibiu, Romania
- Height: 1.70 m (5 ft 7 in)

Gymnastics career
- Discipline: Men's artistic gymnastics
- Country represented: Romania (2006–present)
- Club: CS Dinamo București
Medal record
Men's artistic gymnastics
Representing Romania
World University Games
Bronze medal – third place	2017 Taipei	Vault
Youth Olympic Games
Gold medal – first place	2010 Singapore	Rings
Silver medal – second place	2010 Singapore	Parallel bars
FIG World Cup
Event / 1st / 2nd / 3rd; World Challenge Cup / 2 / 5 / 3

Andrei Vasile Muntean (born 30 January 1993) is a Romanian artistic gymnast. He represented Romania at the 2016 Summer Olympics and placed sixth on the parallel bars. He is the 2017 World University Games vault bronze medalist. He has competed at the World Championships eight times, and he will represent Romania at the 2024 Summer Olympics.

At the junior level, Muntean is the 2010 European parallel bars champion. He won the gold medal on the rings at the 2010 Summer Youth Olympics, becoming Romania's first-ever Youth Olympic Games champion. He also won a silver medal on the parallel bars.

== Junior career ==
Muntean joined the junior national team when he was 13 years old in 2006. He made his international debut at the 2006 Junior European Championships where he helped the Romanian team place fifth. At the 2009 European Youth Olympic Festival, he won a silver medal on the floor exercise behind Russia's David Belyavskiy and a bronze medal with the Romanian team.

Muntean competed at the 2010 Junior European Championships, placing seventh in the all-around final and fourth in the rings final. Then in the parallel bars final, he won the title by 0.050 over Swiss gymnast Oliver Hegi. He then represented Romania at the 2010 Summer Youth Olympics. His first event was the all-around final, where he finished in fourth place, just 0.050 behind the bronze medalist. He also qualified for the pommel horse final where and eighth. In the rings final, he had the highest difficulty score of the event and won the gold medal. This was the first time Romania won a gold medal at the Youth Olympic Games. He also won a silver medal in the parallel bars final behind Ukraine's Oleg Stepko.

== Senior career ==
Muntean became age-eligible for senior international competition in 2011, but he missed most of the year due to an injury.

=== 2013–2014 ===
Muntean won the gold medal on the parallel bars at the 2013 Doha World Challenge Cup. Then at the 2013 European Championships in Moscow, he qualified for the parallel bars final where he placed seventh. He represented Romania at the 2013 Summer Universiade and helped the team place seventh. He made his World Championships debut in 2013, but he did not advance into any finals.

At the 2014 European Championships, Muntean contributed on five of the six apparatus towards Romania's seventh-place finish. Individually, he qualified for the parallel bars final and placed sixth. He finished 33rd in the all-around during the qualification round of the 2014 World Championships, making him the third reserve for the all-around final.

=== 2015–2016 ===
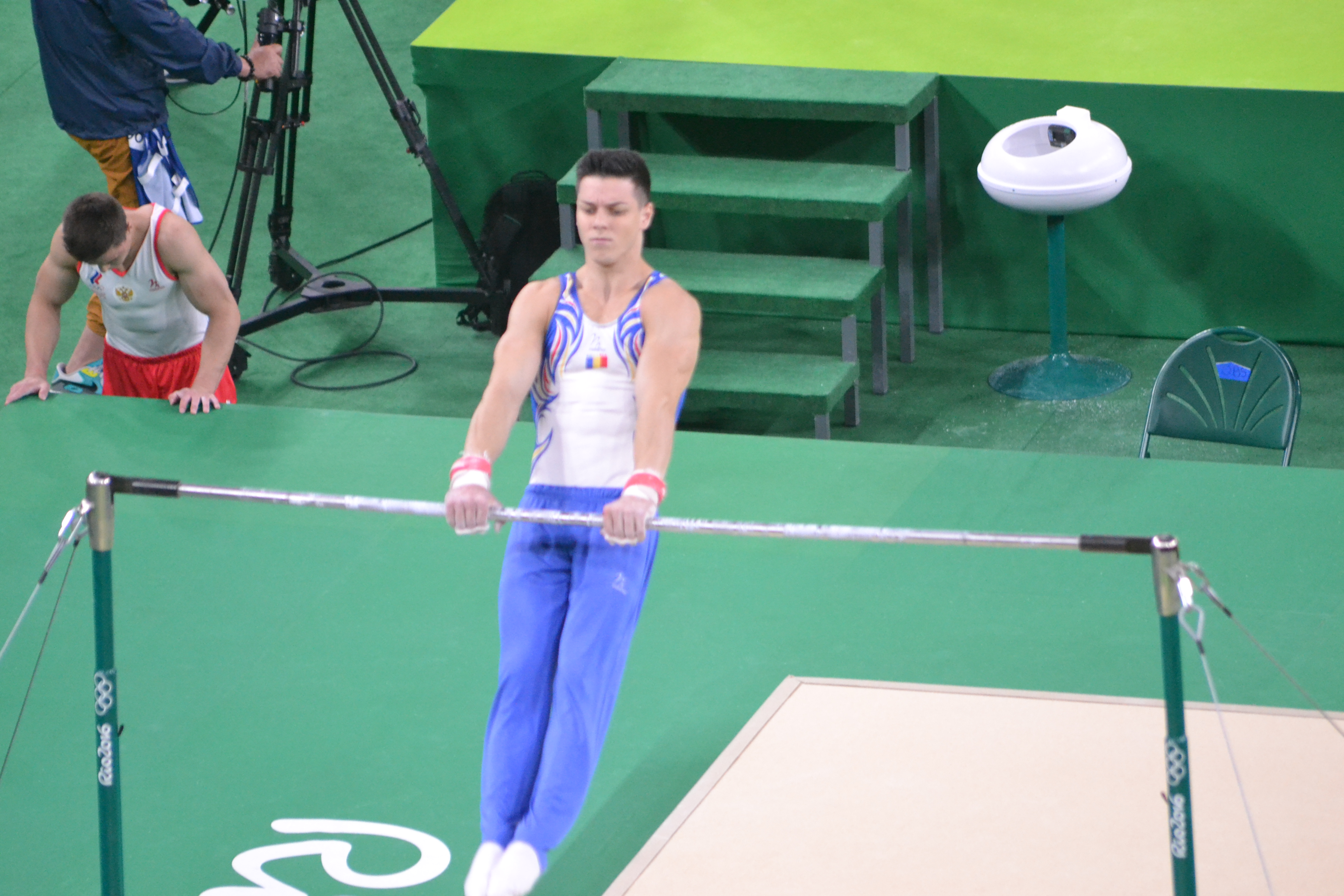
Muntean competing on the horizontal bar at the 2016 Summer Olympics

Muntean won bronze medals on both the still rings and parallel bars at the 2015 Doha World Challenge Cup, and he placed fourth on the vault. He then finished fifth in the parallel bars event final at the 2015 European Championships. Then at the 2015 World Championships in Glasgow, he helped Romania qualify for the 2016 Olympic Test Event with a 14th-place finish. Individually, he placed 11th on the vault, making him the third reserve for the event final. At the Test Event, the Romanian team placed fifth. Although they did not qualify as a team, Romania earned a non-nominative individual berth to the 2016 Olympics. Muntean was selected to compete by the Romanian Gymnastics Federation.

Before the Olympic Games, Muntean competed at the 2016 European Championships and finished fifth in the parallel bars final. Three weeks before the 2016 Olympic Games, he injured his right shoulder. He chose to still compete, but he reduced the difficulty of his routines. At the Olympics, Muntean finished 36th in the all-around during the qualification round, and he qualified for the parallel bars final. In the parallel bars final, he tied for the highest execution score in the final, but he finished sixth overall due to his lower difficulty score. He had surgery on his shoulder in November 2016.

=== 2017–2018 ===
Muntean represented Romania at the 2017 Summer Universiade, helping the Romanian team place 14th. Individually, he qualified for the vault final where he won the bronze medal behind Audrys Nin Reyes and Oleg Verniaiev. He then competed at the 2017 World Championships but did not qualify for any finals. He qualified for the rings final at the 2018 European Championships, finishing eighth.

Muntean won the silver medal on parallel bars at the 2018 Koper World Challenge Cup behind Đinh Phương Thành. Then at the Guimarães World Challenge Cup, he won silver medals on the rings and on the parallel bars, both behind Manrique Larduet. At the Mersin World Challenge Cup, he won the parallel bars title and won the silver medal on rings behind İbrahim Çolak. He won the overall World Challenge Cup parallel bars titles for having the best results across the series, and he was second on the still rings behind Çolak. He qualified for the all-around final at the 2018 World Championships in Doha, finishing 22nd.

=== 2019–2021 ===
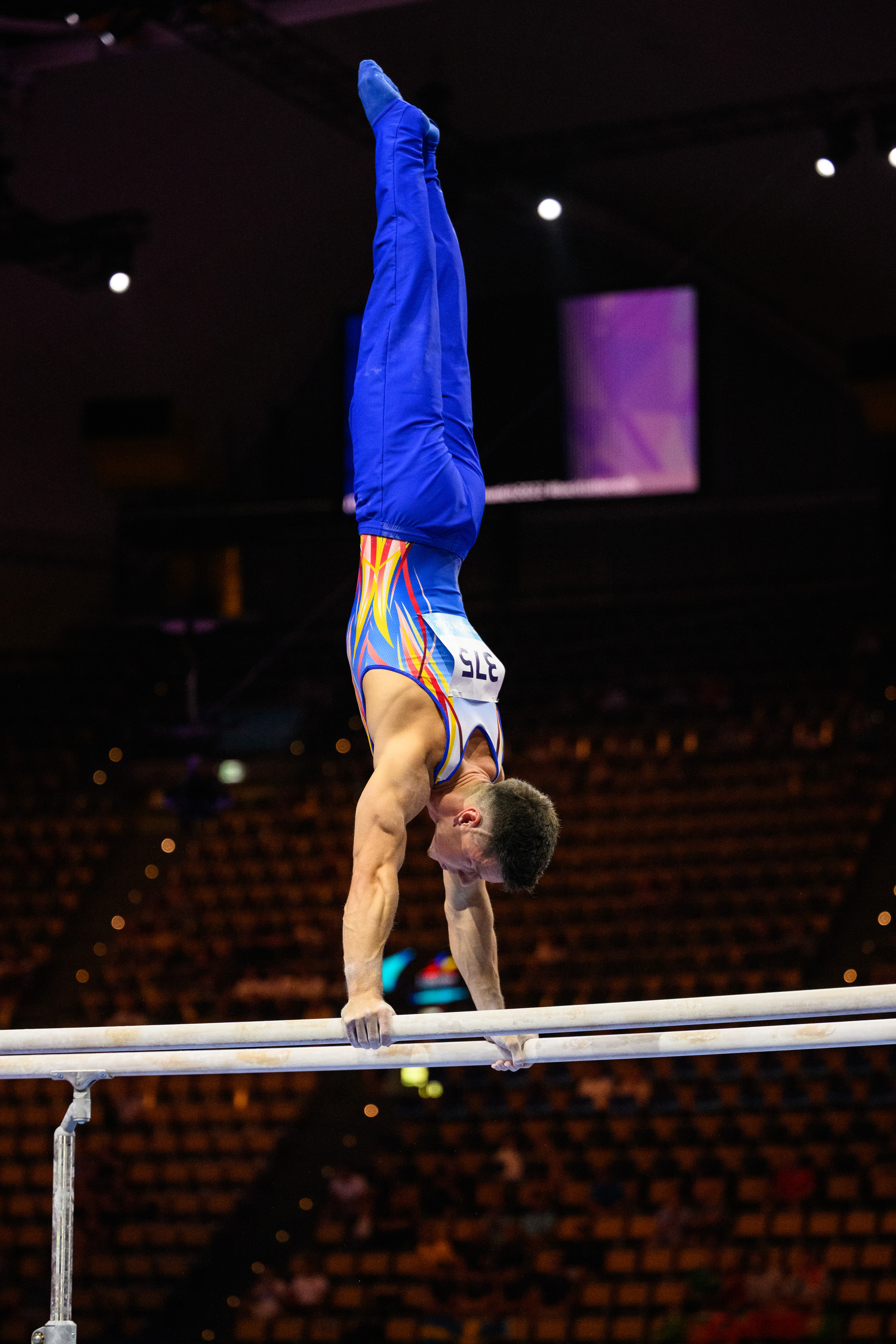
Muntean competing at the 2022 European Championships

Muntean only competed on the floor exercise at the 2019 European Championships, but he did not qualify for the event final. He then competed at the 2019 World Championships, finishing 56th in the all-around during the qualification round. He finished ninth with the Romanian team in the qualification round of the 2020 European Championships.

Muntean was the first reserve for the parallel bars final at the 2021 European Championships. He took a break from competition for the rest of 2021, but he returned to competition at the 2022 Koper World Challenge Cup in June. There, he won the silver medal on the parallel bars behind Ukraine's Petro Pakhnyuk, and he placed fifth on rings. In August, he competed with the Romanian team that placed 10th at the 2022 European Championships. Then at the Mersin World Challenge Cup, he won a bronze medal on parallel bars and placed fourth on rings and sixth on floor exercise. He competed at the 2022 World Championships in Liverpool, helping the Romanian team finish 19th in the qualification round.

=== 2023–2024 ===
Muntean finished fourth in the parallel bars final at the 2023 European Championships. Then at the 2023 World Championships in Antwerp, Muntean finished 30th in the all-around during the qualification round, making him the fourth reserve for the final. As the eighth highest-ranked gymnast from a country that did not qualify a full team, he received an individual quota for the 2024 Olympic Games.

Muntean began the Olympic season at the Antalya World Challenge Cup where he won the bronze medal on the parallel bars behind Nicolau Mir and Radomyr Stelmakh.

== Eponymous skill ==
Muntean has a parallel bars skill named after him in the Code of Points.

Apparatus	Name	Description	Difficulty (Note: Valid for the 2022–2024 Code of Points)	Added to Code of Points
Parallel bars	Muntean	Front uprise and straddled cut backward to hang	C	2017 World Championships
