= Leonardo Affede =

Italian fencer

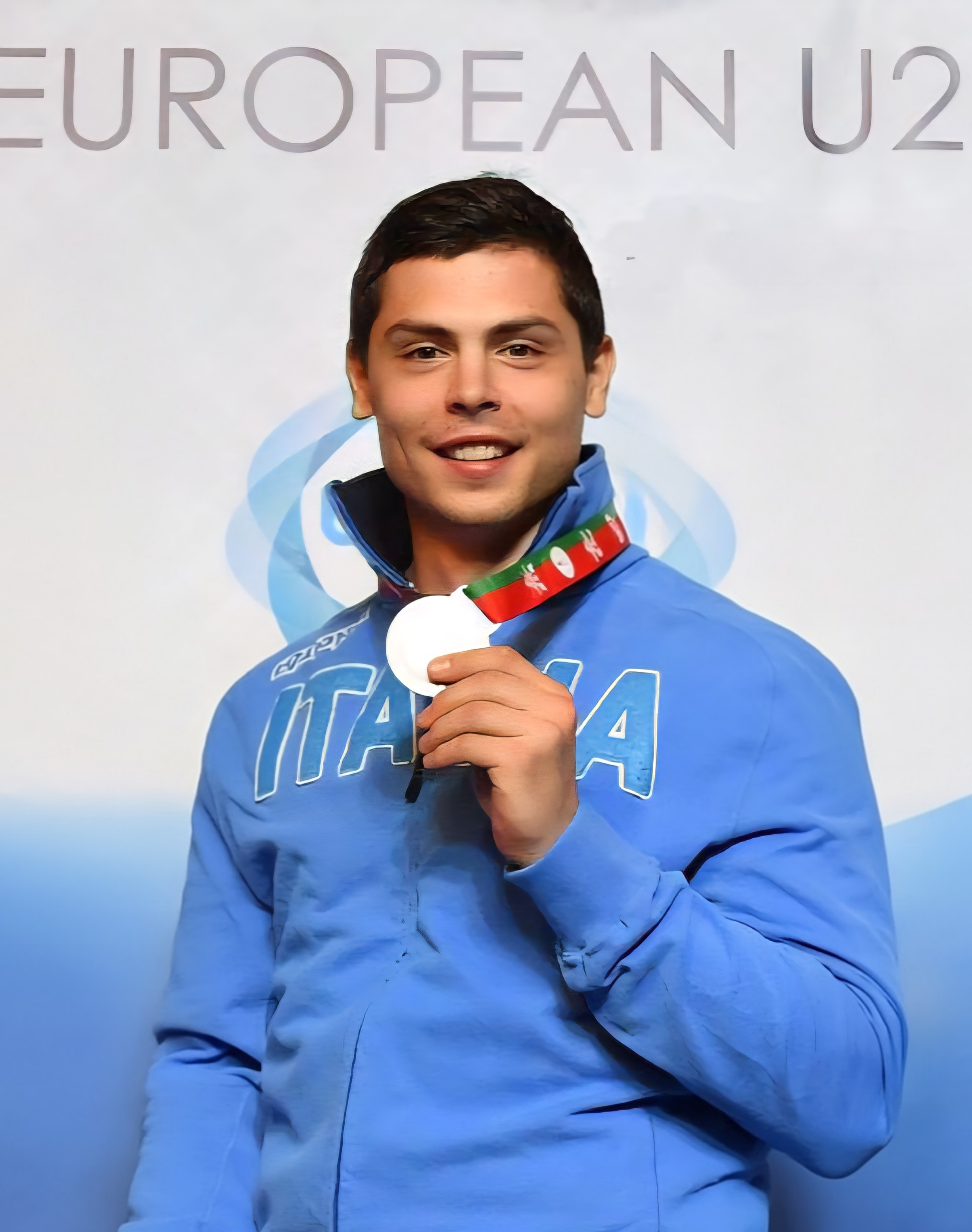

Personal information
- Born: April 26, 1994 (age 32) Rome, Italy
- Height: 1.83 m (6 ft 0 in)

Fencing career
- Sport: Fencing
- Country: Italy
- Weapon: Sabre
- Hand: left-handed
- Club: Fiamme Oro Roma
Medal record
Men's sabre
Representing Italy
Youth Olympic Games
| Gold medal – first place | 2010 Singapore | Team |
| Silver medal – second place | 2010 Singapore | Individual |
Universiade
| Bronze medal – third place | 2010 Gwangju | Individual |
Cadets and Juniors World Championships
| Gold medal – first place | 2014 Plovdiv | Team |
| Silver medal – second place | 2013 Porec | Team |
| Silver medal – second place | 2011 Amman | Team |
| Bronze medal – third place | 2011 Amman | Individual |
| Bronze medal – third place | 2011 Baku | Individual |
Italian Senior National Championships
| Gold medal – first place | 2018 Milan | Team |
| Silver medal – second place | 2017 Gorizia | Team |
| Gold medal – first place | 2016 Rome | Team |
| Bronze medal – third place | 2016 Rome | Individual |
| Silver medal – second place | 2015 Tourin | Team |
| Silver medal – second place | 2013 Trieste | Individual |
| Bronze medal – third place | 2013 Trieste | Team |
| Bronze medal – third place | 2012 Bologna | Team |

Leonardo Affede (Rome, April 26, 1994) is a former Italian fencer, sabre. He was part of the Italian national team and the Fiamme Oro sports section. He won Italy's first-ever medal in the history of the Youth Olympic Games during their inaugural edition in Singapore in 2010, securing silver in the individual competition and gold in the team event.

== Biography ==
Affede is the son of Carola Cicconetti, a former fencer, world champion, and Olympic medalist at the 1984 Summer Olympics in Los Angeles. He is a space and astronautic engineer, who graduated from University of Rome "La Sapienza" in 2020.

== Fencing career ==
Affede grew up at the Club Scherma Roma, before joining the Gruppo Sportivo Fiamme Oro of the Italian State Police at the age of 17. He became a member of the Italian fencing national team starting from the junior categories and later continued his career with the senior national team, achieving numerous national and international results.

In 2010, he was part of the Italian fencing team that participated in the inaugural Youth Olympic Games in Singapore. He won Italy's first-ever medal in the history of the Games, securing silver in the individual competition, and later became Youth Olympic champion in the mixed team event.

In 2014, at the Juniors World Championships in Plovdiv, he won the gold medal for Italy in the team event, reaching the top of the podium with his teammates Luca Curatoli, Francesco D'Armiento, and Francesco Bonsanto. This marked Italy's first-ever victory in the Juniors World Championships team competition.

In 2015, he participated in the 28th Summer Universiade in Gwangju, winning the bronze medal in the individual competition.

In 2016, within the Fiamme Oro team, he won the gold medal at the Italian Senior Fencing Championships, marking their first victory in 24 years, alongside his teammates Luca Curatoli, Riccardo Nuccio, and Stefano Scepi. In the same competition, he won the bronze medal in the individual event, behind Luigi Samele and Giovanni Repetti.

With the same team, he won again the gold medal in the 2018 edition in Milan

He ended his sporting career in April 2021.
