= Benjamin Bataille =

French handball player (born 1992)

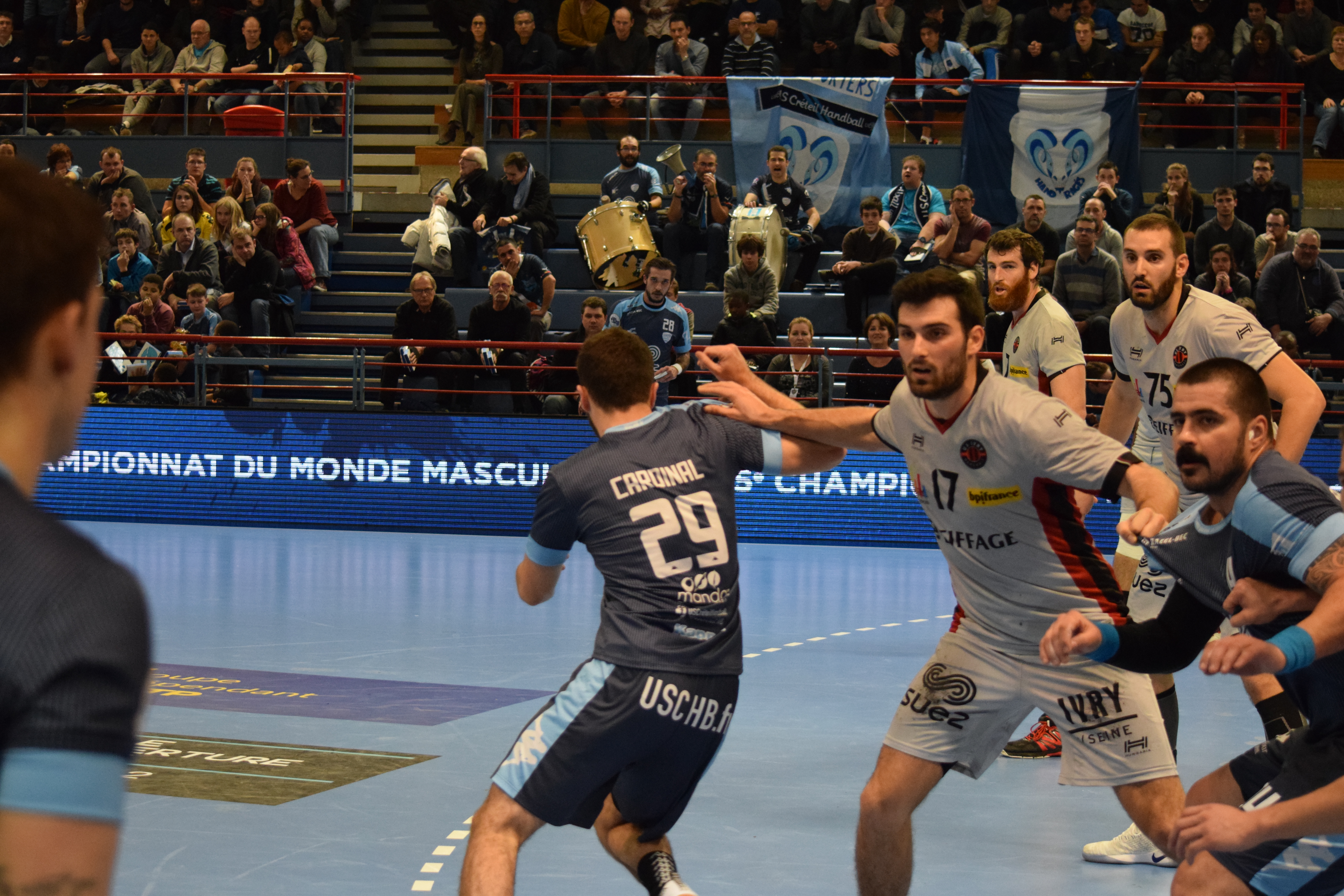

Personal information
- Nationality: French
- Born: 25 July 1992 (age 34) Paris, France
- Height: 1.97 m (6 ft 6 in)

Sport
- Sport: Handball
- Position: Left back/Centre back
- Current club: Saint-Raphaël Var

Senior clubs
- Years: Team
- 2010–2011: US Ivry
- 2011–2012: Massy Essonne Handball
- 2012–2015: Tremblay HB
- 2015–2020: US Ivry
- 2020–2022: Montpellier Handball
- 2022–: Saint-Raphaël Var
Medal record
Junior World Championship
Bronze medal – third place	2013 Bosnia and Herzegovina
Youth Olympic Games
Bronze medal – third place	2010 Singapore

Benjamin Bataille (born 25 July 1992) is a French handball player who plays for Saint-Raphaël Var.
