= Mateja Jeger =

Croatian table tennis player

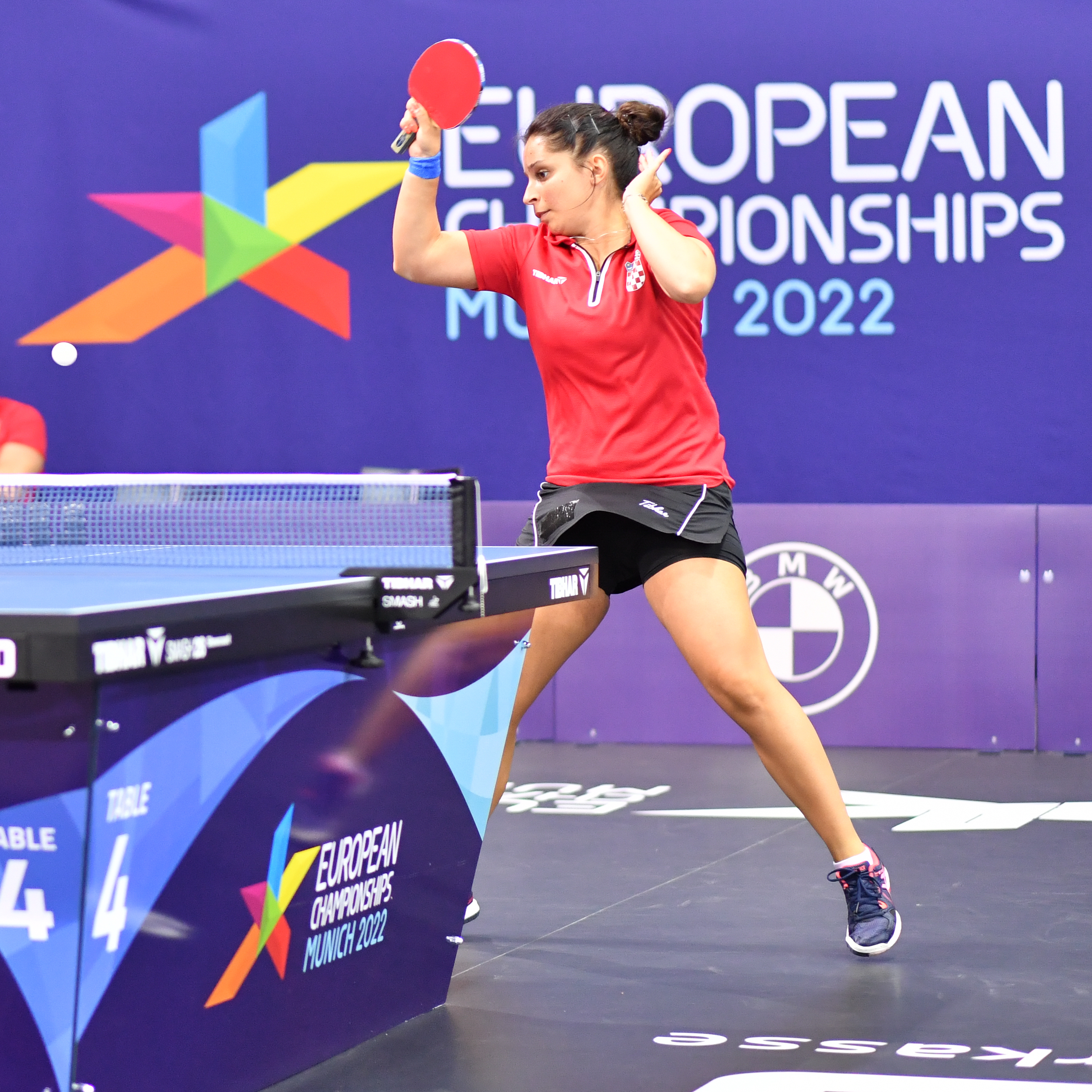

Personal information
- Nationality: Croatian
- Born: 13 January 1995 (age 30)

Sport
- Sport: Table tennis

Mateja Jeger (born 13 January 1995) is a Croatian table tennis player. Her highest career ITTF ranking was 77.
