= Sokhna Galle =

French triple jumper

Personal information
- Born: 22 April 1994 (age 32)

Sport
- Country: France
- Sport: Athletics
- Event: Triple jump

Achievements and titles
- Personal best: Triple jump: 13.61 m (2017)

Sokhna Galle (born 22 April 1994) is a French female triple jumper, who won an individual gold medal at the Youth World Championships.
