= Jordan Coelho =

French swimmer (born 1992)

Personal information
- Nationality: French
- Born: 2 April 1992 (age 34) Étampes

Sport
- Sport: Swimming

Jordan Coelho (born 2 April 1992) is a French swimmer. He competed in the men's 200 metre butterfly event at the 2016 Summer Olympics.
