= Richard Hübers =

German fencer (born 1993)

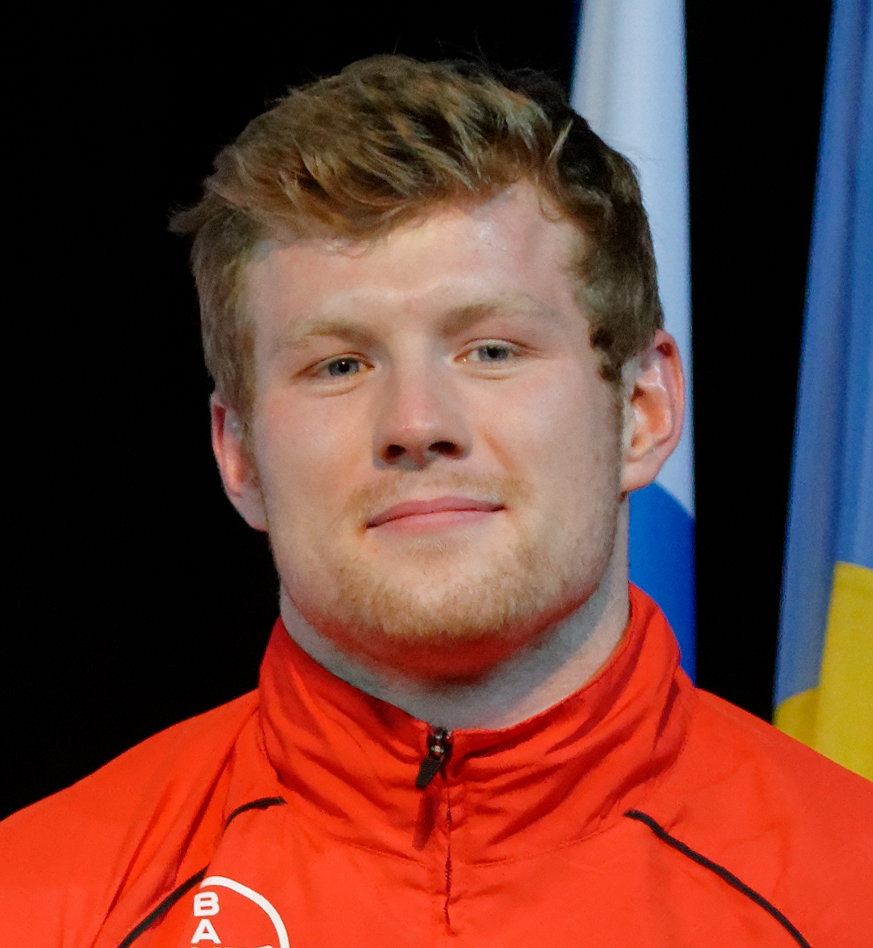

Personal information
- Nationality: German
- Born: 10 February 1993 (age 33) Solingen, Germany

Sport
- Sport: Fencing
Medal record
Men's sabre
Representing Germany
European Games
Bronze medal – third place	2015 Baku	Team
European Championships
Gold medal – first place	2015 Montreux	Team
Bronze medal – third place	2014 Strasbourg	Team
Bronze medal – third place	2018 Novi Sad	Team

Richard Hübers (born 10 February 1993) is a German fencer. He competed in the men's team sabre event at the 2020 Summer Olympics.
