= Triathlon at the Summer Youth Olympics =

- Governing body: ITU
- Events: 2 (men: 1; women: 1)

Games
- 2010; 2014; 2018; 2026

Triathlon has been included in the Summer Youth Olympics since their inauguration. Unlike the Summer Olympic competition, a mixed relay is competed, in which competitors are paired across national boundaries to create evenly matched multinational teams, as part of the Youth Olympic Games' spirit of cooperation.

== Medalists ==
=== Boys' individual ===
Games	Gold	Silver	Bronze
2010 Singapore	Aaron Barclay; New Zealand	Kevin McDowell; United States	Alois Knabl; Austria
2014 Nanjing	Ben Dijkstra; Great Britain	Daniel Hoy; New Zealand	Emil Deleuran Hansen; Denmark
2018 Buenos Aires	Dylan McCullough; New Zealand	Alexandre Montez; Portugal	Alessio Crociani; Italy
2026 Dakar	Artur Gaspar; Portugal	Émile Vanolst; Luxembourg	Daiki Nishizaki; Japan
2026 Dakar	Artur Gaspar; Portugal	Émile Vanolst; Luxembourg	Ramazan Ainegov; Kazakhstan

=== Girls' individual ===
Games	Gold	Silver	Bronze
2010 Singapore	Yuka Sato; Japan	Ellie Salthouse; Australia	Kelly Whitley; United States
2014 Nanjing	Brittany Dutton; Australia	Stephanie Jenks; United States	Émilie Morier; France
2018 Buenos Aires	Amber Schlebusch; South Africa	Sif Bendix Madsen; Denmark	Anja Weber; Switzerland
2026 Dakar	Kimey Casanova; Switzerland	Jázmin Kropkó; Hungary	Evamaria Albert; Estonia

=== Mixed relay ===
Games	Gold	Silver	Bronze
2010 Singapore	Eszter Dudas (HUN); Miguel Valente Fernandes (POR); Fanny Beisaron (ISR); Alois Knabl (AUT)	Ellie Salthouse (AUS); Michael Gosman (AUS); Maddie Dillon (NZL); Aaron Barclay (NZL)	Kelly Whitley (USA); Kevin McDowell (USA); Adriana Barraza (MEX); Lautaro Diaz (ARG)
2014 Nanjing	Kristin Ranwig (GER); Emil Deleuran Hansen (DEN); Emilie Morier (FRA); Ben Dijkstra (GBR)	Sian Rainsley (GBR); Giulio Soldati (ITA); Carmen Gomez Cortes (ESP); Bence Lehmann (HUN)	Brittany Dutton (AUS); Jack van Stekelenburg (AUS); Elizabeth Stannard (NZL); Daniel Hoy (NZL)
2018 Buenos Aires	Europe 1 Sif Bendix Madsen; Denmark; Alessio Crociani; Italy; Anja Weber; Switzerland; Alexandre Montez; Portugal	Oceania 1 Charlotte Derbyshire; Australia; Dylan McCullough; New Zealand; Brea Roderick; New Zealand; Joshua Ferris; Australia	Europe 3 Marie Horn; Germany; Henry Graf; Germany; Emilie Noyer; France; Igor Bellido Mikhailova; Spain

== Medal table ==
As of the 2026 Summer Youth Olympics.

Rank	Nation	Gold	Silver	Bronze	Total
–	Mixed-NOCs	3	3	3	9
1	New Zealand	2	1	0	3
2	Australia	1	1	0	2
2	Portugal	1	1	0	2
4	Japan	1	0	1	2
4	Switzerland	1	0	1	2
6	Great Britain	1	0	0	1
6	South Africa	1	0	0	1
8	United States	0	2	1	3
9	Denmark	0	1	1	2
10	Hungary	0	1	0	1
10	Luxembourg	0	1	0	1
12	Austria	0	0	1	1
12	Estonia	0	0	1	1
12	France	0	0	1	1
12	Italy	0	0	1	1
12	Kazakhstan	0	0	1	1
Totals (16 entries)		11	11	12	34

== See also ==
- Triathlon at the Summer Olympics
