= Triathlon at the 2010 Summer Youth Olympics – Mixed relay =

Mixed relay at the I Summer Youth Olympic Games
- Venue: East Coast Park
- Dates: 19 August 2010
- Competitors: 60 from 41 nations

Medalists
1st place, gold medalist(s)		Europe 1	Mixed-NOCs
2nd place, silver medalist(s)		Oceania 1	Mixed-NOCs
3rd place, bronze medalist(s)		Americas 1	Mixed-NOCs

4× mixed relay triathlon was part of the triathlon at the 2010 Summer Youth Olympics programme. The event consisted of a relay with each athlete performing 250 metres (0.16 mi) of swimming, 7 kilometres (4.3 mi) of cycling, and 1.7 kilometres (1.1 mi) of running. It was held on 19 August 2010 at East Coast Park. The teams were made based on the results of the boys' and girls' triathlon event held of August 15–16, 2010. Each team had two boys and two girls and were split by continent. A total of 15 teams raced in the event.

== Medalists ==
Gold	Silver	Bronze
Europe 1 Eszter Dudás (HUN); Miguel Valente Gernandes (POR); Fanny Beisaron (ISR); Alois Knabl (AUT)	Oceania 1 Ellie Salthouse (AUS); Michael Gosman (AUS); Maddie Dillon (NZL); Aaron Barclay (NZL)	Americas 1 Kelly Whitley (USA); Kevin McDowell (USA); Adriana Barraza (MEX); Lautaro Diaz (ARG)

== Results ==
The race began at approximately 9:00 a.m. (UTC+8) on 19 August at East Coast Park.

Rank	Start No.	Team	Triathletes	Individual Time	Total time	Difference
1st place, gold medalist(s)	1	Europe 1	Eszter Dudás (HUN); Miguel Valente Fernandes (POR); Fanny Beisaron (ISR); Alois Knabl (AUT)	20:46; 18.58; 21:11; 18:56	1:19:51.42	±0:00.00
2nd place, silver medalist(s)	3	Oceania 1	Ellie Salthouse (AUS); Michael Gosman (AUS); Maddie Dillon (NZL); Aaron Barclay (NZL)	20:36; 19:07; 21:11; 19:01	1:19:55.23	+0:03.81
3rd place, bronze medalist(s)	2	Americas 1	Kelly Whitley (USA); Kevin McDowell (USA); Adriana Barraza (MEX); Lautaro Diaz (ARG)	20:22; 18:29; 21:44; 19:23	1:19:58.88	+0:07.46
4	4	Europe 2	Marlene Gomez (GER); Jeremy Obozil (FRA); Laura Casey (IRL); Lukas Kocar (CZE)	20:53; 19:47; 21:54; 19:37	1:22:11.38	+2:19.96
5	6	Americas 2	Christine Ridenour (CAN); Luis Oliveros (MEX); Andrea Longueira (CHI); Juan Andrade (ECU)	20:21; 18:47; 23:07; 20:15	1:22:30.15	+2:38.73
6	5	Europe 3	Monika Oražem (SLO); Gabor Hanko (HUN); Anna Godoy (ESP); Tobias Klesen (GER)	21:05; 19:29; 22:14; 20:01	1:22:49.66	+2:58.24
7	7	Europe 4	Annie Thoren (SWE); Thomas Jurgens (BEL); Elinor Thorogood (GBR); Andrew Hood (GBR)	21:11; 19:08; 22:04; 20:31	1:22:54.12	+3:02.70
8	9	Asia 1	Sato Yuka (JPN); Ji Hong Lee (KOR); Wai Sum Vincci Hui (HKG); Ru Cheng (CHN)	20:16; 20:06; 22:19; 20:39	1:23:20.88	+3:29.46
9	8	World Team 1	Sara Vilic (CRO); Abrahm Louw (NAM); Andrea Brown (ZIM); Wian Sullwald (RSA)	21:23; 19:07; 23:11; 19:56	1:23:37.79	+3:46.37
10	10	Europe 5	Charlotte Deldaele (BEL); Andriy Sirenko (UKR); Raquel Mafra Rocha (POR); Diego Paz (ESP)	20:48; 19:26; 23:05; 20:30	1:23:49.96	+3:58.54
11	11	Americas 3	Jessica Piedra (ECU); Carlos Perez (VEN); Leslie Amat Alvarez (CUB); Iuri Vinuto (BRA)	22:30; 19:53; 23:32; 20:39	1:26:34.25	+6:42.83
12	15	World Team 2	Wan Qi Clara Wong (SIN); Livio Molinari (ITA); C. L. Betancourt de Leon (PUR); Boyd Littleford (ZIM)	22:55; 19:36; 23:40; 21:23	1:27:34.96	+7:43.54
13	12	Asia 2	Mingxiu Ma (CHN); Leong Tim Law (HKG); Karolina Solovyova (KAZ); Yuki Kubono (JPN)	22:55; 20:43; 23:54; 20:08	1:27:40.62	+7:49.20
14	14	Americas 4	Andrea Arenas (VEN); Gabriel Zumbado (CRC); Viviana González (COL); Andres Diaz (COL)	23:17; 20:44; 23:30; 20:21	1:27:52.84	+8:01.42
15	16	Asia 3	Tüvshinjargalyn Enkhjargal (MGL); Kirill Uvarov (KAZ); Mattika Maneekaew (THA); Scott Yiqiang Ang (SIN)	25:14; 21:02; 25:50; 22:22	1:34:28.69	+14:37.27

Note: No one is allotted the number 13.
