= Austria at the 2010 Summer Youth Olympics =

- IOC code: AUT
- NOC: Austrian Olympic Committee
- Website: www.olympia.at

in Singapore
- Competitors: 16 in 12 sports
- Flag bearer: Lara Vadlau
- Medals Ranked 46th: Gold 1 Silver 0 Bronze 3 Total 4

Summer Youth Olympics appearances (overview)
- 2010; 2014; 2018

Austria competed at the 2010 Summer Youth Olympics, the inaugural Youth Olympic Games, held in Singapore from 14 August to 26 August 2010.

The Austrian team consisted of 16 athletes competing in 12 sports: aquatics (swimming), athletics, badminton, canoe/kayak, gymnastics, judo, rowing, sailing, shooting, table tennis, triathlon and wrestling.

== Medalists ==
Medal	Name	Sport	Event	Date
Gold	Alois Knabl	Triathlon	4x Mixed Team Relay (in mixed-NOC team with Europe 1)	19 Aug
Gold	Lara Vadlau	Sailing	Byte CII - Girls' One Person Dinghy	25 Aug
Bronze	Alois Knabl	Triathlon	Boys' Triathlon	16 Aug
Bronze	Christine Huck	Judo	Girls' -52kg	22 Aug
Bronze	Viktoria Wolffhardt	Canoeing	K1 Obstacle Canoe Slalom Women	25 Aug
Bronze	Christine Huck	Judo	Mixed Team (in mixed-NOC team with Cairo)	25 Aug

== Athletics ==
=== Girls ===
Field Events

Athletes	Event	Qualification		Final	
Athletes	Event	Result	Rank	Result	Rank
Ivona Dadič	Girls’ Long Jump	5.93	6 Q	5.91	6
Kira Grünberg	Girls’ Pole Vault	3.80	6 Q	3.90	5

== Badminton ==
Girls

Athlete	Event	Group Stage				Knock-Out Stage			
Athlete	Event	Match 1	Match 2	Match 3	Rank	Quarterfinal	Semifinal	Final	Rank
Alexandra Mathis	Girls’ Singles	Ketpura (USA) L 0-2 (10-21, 9-21)	Palermo (FRA) L 0-2 (19-21, 12-21)	Milne (GBR) L 0-2 (11-21, 10-21)	4	Did not advance			

== Canoeing ==
Girls

Athlete	Event	Time Trial		Round 1	Round 2 (Rep)	Round 3	Round 4	Round 5	Final	Rank
Athlete	Event	Time	Rank	Round 1	Round 2 (Rep)	Round 3	Round 4	Round 5	Final	Rank
Viktoria Wolffhardt	Girls’ K1 Slalom	1:39.13	3	Barrera (ARG); W 1:37.12-2:07.59		Bruska (POL); W 1:38.89-2:02.09	Grewelding (GER); W 1:39.00-1:43.94	Zasterova (CZE); L 1:38.23-1:37.02	Novak (SLO); W 1:37.43-1:37.44	Bronze medal
Viktoria Wolffhardt	Girls’ K1 Sprint	DNF		Did not advance						

== Gymnastics ==
=== Artistic Gymnastics ===
Girls

Athlete	Event	Vault		Uneven Bars		Beam		Floor		Total	
Athlete	Event	Score	Rank	Score	Rank	Score	Rank	Score	Rank	Score	Rank
Elisa Haemmerle	Girls' Qualification	13.450	15	12.150	19	12.750	19	13.000	11	51.350	13 Q
Elisa Haemmerle	Girls' Individual All-Around	13.400	14	12.400	12	12.700	13	13.350	6	51.850	12

== Judo ==
Individual

Athlete	Event	Round 1	Round 2	Round 3	Semifinals	Final	Rank
Athlete	Event	Opposition Result	Opposition Result	Opposition Result	Opposition Result	Opposition Result	Rank
Michael Greiter	Boys' -81 kg	Omerovic (BIH); W 010-000	Toth (HUN); L 000-002	Repechage; Fernandez (HUN); W 110-000	Repechage; Szakacs (SVK); L 000-110	Did not advance	7
Christine Huck	Girls' -52 kg	BYE	Rosso-Richetto (FRA); W 001-000		Bouyssou (USA); L 000-101	Bronze Medal Match; Prince (NED); W 011-000	

Team

Team	Event	Round 1	Round 2	Semifinals	Final	Rank
Team	Event	Opposition Result	Opposition Result	Opposition Result	Opposition Result	Rank
Barcelona; Julia Ross-Richetto (FRA); Subasj Yadav (IND); Yu-Chun Wu (TPE); Maxamillian Schneider (USA); Natalia Rak (EST); Michael Greiter (AUT); Gulnoza Matniyazova (UZB); Bolot Toktogonov (KGZ)	Mixed Team	Osaka; L 3-5	Did not advance			9
Cairo; Neha Thakur (IND); Mansurkhuja Muminkhujaev (UZB); Christine Huck (AUT); Ioan Visan (ROU); Andrea Guillen (CRC); Eldin Omerovic (BIH); Barbara Matic (CRO); Pedro Pineda (VEN)	Mixed Team	Birmingham; W 5-2	Hamilton; W 4-4 (3-2)	Essen; L 2-5	Did not advance	Bronze medal

== Rowing ==
Athlete	Event	Heats		Repechage		Semifinals		Final		Overall Rank
Athlete	Event	Time	Rank	Time	Rank	Time	Rank	Time	Rank	Overall Rank
Paul Sieber	Boys' Single Sculls	3:29.05	5 QR	3:36.96	4 QC/D	3:43.00	1 QC	3:36.56	3	14
Jana Hausberger	Girls' Single Sculls	4:07.85	6 QR	4:13.68	5 QC/D	4:18.94	4 QD	4:14.74	2	19

== Sailing ==
One Person Dinghy

Athlete	Event	Race												Points	Rank
Athlete	Event	1	2	3	4	5	6	7	8	9	10	11	M*	Points	Rank
Lara Vadlau	Girls' Byte CII	~~5~~	1	~~9~~	1	1	3	4	3	2	5	3	4	27	Gold medal

== Shooting ==
Rifle

Athlete	Event	Qualification		Final		
Athlete	Event	Score	Rank	Score	Total	Rank
Stefan Rumpler	Boys' 10m Air Rifle	576	18	Did not advance		
Cornelia Enser	Girls' 10m Air Rifle	383	18	Did not advance		

== Swimming ==
Athletes	Event	Heat		Semifinal		Final	
Athletes	Event	Time	Position	Time	Position	Time	Position
Jakub Maly	Boys’ 100m Breaststroke	1:04.52	8 Q	1:04.85	12	Did not advance	
Jakub Maly	Boys’ 200m Butterfly	2:03.63	9			Did not advance	
Jakub Maly	Boys’ 200m Individual Medley	2:04.76	11			Did not advance	

== Table tennis ==
Individual

Athlete	Event	Round 1		Round 2		Quarterfinals	Semifinals	Final	Rank
Athlete	Event	Group Matches	Rank	Group Matches	Rank	Quarterfinals	Semifinals	Final	Rank
Stefan Leitgeb	Boys' Singles	Mutti (ITA); W 3-1 (11-8, 11-5, 11-13, 11-8)	2 Q	Onaolapo (NGR); L 0-3 (7-11, 9-11, 3-11)	3	Did not advance			9
Stefan Leitgeb	Boys' Singles	Das (IND); W 3-0 (11-6, 11-7, 11-9)	2 Q	Chew (SIN); W 3-2 (9-11, 11-8, 11-8, 5-11, 11-3)	3	Did not advance			9
Stefan Leitgeb	Boys' Singles	Vanrossomme (BEL); L 1-3 (9-11, 11-6, 3-11, 2-11)	2 Q	Soderlund (SWE); L 0-3 (7-11, 7-11, 7-11)	3	Did not advance			9

Team

Athlete	Event	Round 1		Round 2	Quarterfinals	Semifinals	Final	Rank
Athlete	Event	Group Matches	Rank	Round 2	Quarterfinals	Semifinals	Final	Rank
Europe 6 Alex Galic (SLO); Stefan Leitgeb (AUT)	Mixed Team	France; Pang (FRA); Gauzy (FRA); L 1-2 (0-3, 0-3, 3-2)	3 qB	Pan America 3 Rosheuvel (GUY); Tapia (ECU); W 2-0 (3-0, 3-0)	Pan America 1 Hsing (USA); Gavilan (PAR); W 2-0 (3-2, 3-1)	Did not advance		17
Europe 6 Alex Galic (SLO); Stefan Leitgeb (AUT)	Mixed Team	Intercontinental 3 Phan (AUS); Mejia (ESA); W 3-0 (3-0, 3-1, 3-0)	3 qB	Pan America 3 Rosheuvel (GUY); Tapia (ECU); W 2-0 (3-0, 3-0)	Pan America 1 Hsing (USA); Gavilan (PAR); W 2-0 (3-2, 3-1)	Did not advance		17
Europe 6 Alex Galic (SLO); Stefan Leitgeb (AUT)	Mixed Team	Europe 2 Xiao (POR); Vanrossomme (BEL); L 0-3 (0-3, 1-3, 2-3)	3 qB	Pan America 3 Rosheuvel (GUY); Tapia (ECU); W 2-0 (3-0, 3-0)	Pan America 1 Hsing (USA); Gavilan (PAR); W 2-0 (3-2, 3-1)	Did not advance		17

== Triathlon ==
Men's

Athlete	Event	Swim (750 m)	Trans 1	Bike (20 km)	Trans 2	Run (5 km)	Total	Rank
Alois Knabl	Individual	8:39	0:33	28:39	0:22	16:51	55:04.72	3rd place, bronze medalist(s)

Mixed

Athlete	Event	Total Times per Athlete (Swim 250 m, Bike 7 km, Run 1.7 km)	Total Group Time	Rank
Eszter Dudas (HUN); Miguel Valente Gernandes (POR); Fanny Beisaron (ISR); Alois Knabl (AUT)	Mixed Team Relay; Europe 1	20:46; 18.58; 21:11; 18:56	1:19:51.42	1st place, gold medalist(s)

== Wrestling ==
Freestyle

Athlete	Event	Pools		Final	Rank
Athlete	Event	Groups	Rank	Final	Rank
Martina Kuenz	Girls' 70kg	Stankova (UKR); L 0–2 (0–1, 0–3)	3	5th Place Match; Ali (POL); W 2–0 (2–0, 2–0)	5
Martina Kuenz	Girls' 70kg	Yeats (CAN); L 0–2 (0–1, 0–1)	3	5th Place Match; Ali (POL); W 2–0 (2–0, 2–0)	5
Martina Kuenz	Girls' 70kg	Nemeth (HUN); W Fall (7–0)	3	5th Place Match; Ali (POL); W 2–0 (2–0, 2–0)	5
