= Triathlon at the 2010 Summer Youth Olympics – Boys' =

Boys' at the I Summer Youth Olympic Games
- Venue: East Coast Park
- Dates: 16 August 2010
- Competitors: 32 from 32 nations

Medalists
1st place, gold medalist(s)		Aaron Barclay	New Zealand
2nd place, silver medalist(s)		Kevin McDowell	United States
3rd place, bronze medalist(s)		Alois Knabl	Austria

Boys' triathlon was part of the triathlon at the 2010 Summer Youth Olympics programme. The event consisted of 750 metres (0.47 mi) swimming, 20 kilometres (12 mi) cycling, and 5 kilometres (3.1 mi) running. It was held on 16 August 2010 at East Coast Park. The park is Singapore's most popular public beach and park; it is the venue of the Osim Singapore Triathlon, an Olympic triathlon event which began in 2002. Competitors swam in the open seas of the Singapore Strait and raced on the park's 12-kilometre (7.5 mi) track.

Aaron Barclay of New Zealand finished the race in first place. He was among the first few athletes to complete the first leg of the race and led a pack of nine riders in the second leg. Barclay ran neck and neck with Kevin McDowell of the United States before reaching the finish line. The event was Barclay's first triathlon outside Oceania, and his gold medal was New Zealand's first medal in the Youth Olympics. McDowell, who was a favourite to win the race after winning the American qualifying event, finished in second place. Alois Knabl of Austria finished third to win the bronze medal. Knabl was one of several athletes from his country who had the highest chances of winning a medal. Zimbabwe's Boyd Littleford and Bermuda's Ryan Gunn, who were in the final two places after the swimming segment, teamed up to complete the race together. Littleford had difficulties swimming when his goggles broke while underwater. Singapore's Scott Ang finished the race in 29th place.

== Medalists ==
Gold	Silver	Bronze
Aaron Barclay; New Zealand	Kevin McDowell; United States	Alois Knabl; Austria

== Results ==
The race began at approximately 9:00 a.m. (UTC+8) on 16 August at East Coast Park.

Rank	Start No.	Triathlete	Swimming	Transit 1	Cycling	Transit 2	Running	Total time	Difference
1st place, gold medalist(s)	7	Aaron Barclay (NZL)	8:39	0:29	28:39	0:22	16:32	54:41.49	±0:00.00
2nd place, silver medalist(s)	27	Kevin McDowell (USA)	8:54	0:27	28:31	0:22	16:41	54:55.28	+0:13.79
3rd place, bronze medalist(s)	16	Alois Knabl (AUT)	8:39	0:33	28:39	0:22	16:51	55:04.72	+0:23.23
4	1	Miguel Valente Fernandes (POR)	8:42	0:30	28:40	0:22	16:58	55:12.57	+0:30.98
5	8	Abraham Louw (NAM)	8:39	0:33	28:40	0:28	17:08	55:28.99	+0:47.50
6	28	Lukas Kocar (CZE)	8:54	0:30	28:28	0:25	17:40	55:57.33	+1:15.84
7	14	Jeremy Obozil (FRA)	8:53	0:29	28:28	0:22	18:09	56:21.21	+1:39.72
8	30	Wian Sullwald (RSA)	9:19	0:31	29:22	0:26	16:48	56:26.68	+1:45.19
9	9	Gabor Hanko (HUN)	9:18	0:30	29:24	0:22	17:15	56:49.17	+2:07.68
10	25	Lautaro Diaz (ARG)	8:40	0:33	28:38	0:25	18:38	56:54.91	+2:13.42
11	18	Juan Andrade (ECU)	8:53	0:28	30:06	0:25	17:09	57:01.41	+2:19.92
12	26	Michael Gosman (AUS)	9:19	0:31	29:24	0:27	17:21	57:02.83	+2:21.34
13	4	Luis Oliveros (MEX)	8:59	0:31	29:47	0:27	17:22	57:06.35	+2:24.86
14	32	Tobias Klesen (GER)	9:14	0:31	29:28	0:25	17:36	57:14.23	+2:32.74
15	10	Andrew Hood (GBR)	9:06	0:32	29:36	0:23	17:40	57:17.54	+2:36.05
16	2	Cheng Ru (CHN)	9:16	0:34	29:26	0:25	17:45	57:26.94	+2:45.45
17	21	Thomas Jurgens (BEL)	8:38	0:30	28:44	0:25	19:18	57:35.16	+2:53.67
18	33	Carlos Peres (VEN)	8:54	0:31	29:49	0:24	17:57	57:35.52	+2:54.03
19	29	Andriy Sirenko (UKR)	9:04	0:29	29:39	0:24	18:09	57:45.67	+3:04.18
20	11	Diego Paz (ESP)	9:20	0:32	29:24	0:25	18:10	57:51.69	+3:10.20
21	12	Livio Molinari (ITA)	8:55	0:30	29:53	0:25	18:18	58:01.34	+3:19.85
22	3	Iuri Vinuto (BRA)	9:30	0:28	30:22	0:20	17:27	58:07.96	+3:26.47
23	23	Andres Diaz (COL)	9:03	0:30	29:40	0:24	18:51	58:28.67	+3:47.18
24	17	Lee Ji Hong (KOR)	9:13	0:32	30:36	0:23	17:44	58:28.81	+3:47.32
25	6	Law Leong Tim (HKG)	9:01	0:34	29:42	0:25	19:13	58:55.12	+4:13.63
26	15	Yuki Kubono (JPN)	9:21	0:35	30:26	0:25	18:39	59:26.04	+4:44.55
27	24	Kirill Uvarov (KAZ)	9:21	0:33	30:27	0:26	18:45	59:32.92	+4:51.43
28	5	Gabriel Zumbado (CRC)	9:30	0:32	30:23	0:24	19:30	1:00:19.17	+5:37.68
29	31	Scott Yiqiang Ang (SIN)	9:20	0:32	30:33	0:27	21:23	1:02:15.11	+7:33.62
30	19	Boyd Littleford (ZIM)	10:49	0:29	31:43	0:23	20:29	1:03:53.25	+9:11.76
31	22	Ryan Gunn (BER)	10:37	0:31	32:07	0:22	20:52	1:04:29.34	+9:47.85
—	20	Brook Powell (CAN)	8:50	0:32	30:00	0:25	—	Did not finish	—

Note: No one is allotted the number 13.
