= Shooting at the 2010 Summer Youth Olympics – Boys' 10 metre air rifle =

These are the results of the boys' 10m air rifle event at the 2010 Youth Olympic Games. The competition took place on August 22, with the qualification at 9:00 and the Finals at 12:00.

== Medalists ==
Gold	Ting Jie Gao; China
Silver	Illia Charheika; Belarus
Bronze	Serhiy Kulish; Ukraine

== Qualification ==
Rank	Athlete	Series						Total	X	Shoot-off
Rank	Athlete	1	2	3	4	5	6	Total	X	Shoot-off
1	Ting Jie Gao (CHN)	99	97	99	100	100	99	594	48	
2	Illia Charheika (BLR)	99	99	99	100	98	98	593	43	
3	Serhiy Kulish (UKR)	98	98	98	99	100	98	591	44	
4	Simon Weithaler (ITA)	98	99	99	95	100	99	590	41	
5	Yong Kim (KOR)	97	99	98	99	98	99	590	39	
6	Alexander Thomas (GER)	96	98	100	99	97	98	588	42	
7	Erick Arzate Marchan (MEX)	98	99	96	97	100	97	587	39	52.1
8	Navdeep Singh Rathore (IND)	96	98	100	97	98	98	587	41	46.5
9	Jaakko Bjorkbacka (FIN)	98	95	98	100	98	98	587	34	45.1
10	Tiziano Suran (CRO)	99	99	97	96	99	96	586	40	
11	John Coombes (AUS)	99	98	99	98	94	98	586	35	
12	Istvan Kapas (HUN)	100	97	95	97	97	99	585	31	
13	Petr Plechac (CZE)	96	98	99	96	97	98	584	37	
14	Jan Lochbihler (SUI)	96	97	97	97	99	96	582	40	
15	Irshat Avkhadiyev (KAZ)	99	94	96	97	97	99	582	35	
16	Elvin Aroldo Lopez (GUA)	95	98	97	96	99	97	582	31	
17	Hossam Salah Eldeen (EGY)	95	97	98	97	97	95	579	28	
18	Stefan Rumpler (AUT)	85	98	99	99	99	96	576	36	A 10.0
19	Egor Maksimov (RUS)	98	99	93	93	95	96	574	26	
20	Salem Alqaydi (UAE)	92	92	95	93	93	93	558	16	

== Final ==
Rank	Athlete	Quali	Series										Final	Total
Rank	Athlete	Quali	1	2	3	4	5	6	7	8	9	10	Final	Total
1st place, gold medalist(s)	Ting Jie Gao (CHN)	594	8.9	10.3	10.0	10.7	10.5	9.6	10.3	10.1	10.0	10.5	100.9	694.9
2nd place, silver medalist(s)	Illia Charheika (BLR)	593	9.9	10.4	10.0	10.1	10.5	10.6	9.9	9.9	10.4	9.4	101.1	694.1
3rd place, bronze medalist(s)	Serhiy Kulish (UKR)	591	9.4	10.5	10.2	10.3	10.4	10.7	9.7	9.8	10.5	10.3	101.8	692.8
4	Yong Kim (KOR)	590	9.9	10.0	10.2	10.6	10.4	10.8	10.6	9.5	10.1	10.5	102.6	692.6
5	Alexander Thomas (GER)	588	10.2	10.0	10.3	9.2	10.2	10.3	10.4	10.5	10.6	10.6	102.3	690.3
6	Erick Arzate Marchan (MEX)	587	10.3	10.1	10.1	10.4	10.3	10.2	9.6	10.5	9.8	10.1	101.4	688.4
7	Simon Weithaler (ITA)	590	10.6	10.3	9.9	8.8	10.3	9.7	9.1	9.1	9.7	10.3	97.8	687.8
8	Bavdeep Singh Rathore (IND)	587	8.8	9.6	10.2	10.1	9.6	8.8	10.5	10.6	10.4	9.9	98.5	685.5
