= Field hockey at the 2010 Summer Youth Olympics =

Field hockey at the I Summer Youth Olympic Games
- Venue: Sengkang Hockey Stadium
- Dates: 16 – 23 August 2010
- No. of events: 2 (1 boys, 1 girls)
- Competitors: 132 (66 boys, 66 girls) from 12 nations

Field hockey was one of the 26 sports featured at the 2010 Summer Youth Olympics from 16–23 August 2010 at Sengkang Hockey Stadium in Singapore. Players must have been born between 1 January 1993 and 31 December 1994.

== Qualification ==
Each winner of five continental qualification tournaments gained automatic entry. The hosts Singapore were limited to fielding just one team. Singapore chose to field a boys' team, and the extra unused quota in the girls' tournament was allocated to Europe. The full list of qualified teams is as below:

Continent	Boys	Girls
Europe	Belgium	Netherlands; Ireland
Americas	Chile	Argentina
Asia	Pakistan	South Korea
Oceania	Australia	New Zealand
Africa	Ghana	South Africa
Host	Singapore	—N/a

== Medal summary ==
Event	Gold	Silver	Bronze
Boys'	Australia	Pakistan	Belgium
Girls'	Netherlands	Argentina	New Zealand
