= Triathlon at the 2010 Summer Youth Olympics =

Triathlon at the I Summer Youth Olympic Games
- Venue: East Coast Park
- Dates: 15 – 19 August 2010
- No. of events: 3 (1 boys, 1 girls, 1 mixed)
- Competitors: 64 (32 boys, 32 girls) from 42 nations

Triathlon at the 2010 Summer Youth Olympics in Singapore took place at East Coast Park. There were competitions on August 15, 16 and 19.

== Rules ==
=== Individuals ===
- 750M Swim in Open Water
- 3 lap cycling (20 km)
- 2 lap run (5 km)

=== 4x Mixed relay ===
- 250m Swim in Open Water
- 7 km cycle race (one lap)
- 1.7 km run (one lap)

== Schedule ==
Time	Date	Competition
09:00	August 15	Girls
09:00	August 16	Boys
09:00	August 19	4x Mixed Relay

== Qualified athletes ==
=== Boys ===
Starting No.	Name	Country
1	Miguel Fernandes	Portugal
2	Ru Cheng	China
3	Iuri Vinuto Josino	Brazil
4	Octavio Oliveros	Mexico
5	Gabriel Zumbado	Costa Rica
6	Tim Law Leong	Hong Kong
7	Aaron Barclay	New Zealand
8	Abraham Louw	Namibia
9	Gábor Hankó	Hungary
10	Andrew Hood	Great Britain
11	Diego Paz Sobreira	Spain
12	Livio Molinari	Italy
14	Jérémy Obozil	France
15	Yuuki Kubono	Japan
16	Alois Knabl	Austria
17	Ji Hong Lee	South Korea
18	Juan Jose Andrade Figueroa	Ecuador
19	Andrew Zographos	Zimbabwe
20	Boyd Littleford	Zimbabwe
21	Brook Powell	Canada
22	Thomas Jurgens	Belgium
23	Ryan Gunn	Bermuda
24	Andres Eduardo Diaz	Colombia
25	Kirill Uvarov	Kazakhstan
26	Lautaro Diaz	Argentina
27	Michael Gosman	Australia
28	Kevin McDowell	United States
29	Lukas Kocar	Czech Republic
30	Andiry Sirenko	Ukraine
31	Wian Sullwald	South Africa
32	Scott Ang	Singapore
33	Tobias Klesen	Germany

=== Girls ===
Starting No.	Name	Country
1	Hui Wai Sum, Vincci	Hong Kong
2	Kelly Whitley	United States
3	Monika Oražem	Slovenia
4	Leslie Amat Alvarez	Cuba
5	Mingxiu Ma	China
6	Clara Wong	Singapore
7	Mattika Maneekaew	Thailand
8	Andrea Arenas	Venezuela
9	Alessia Orla	Italy
10	Yuka Sato	Japan
11	Tuvshinjargal Enkhjargal	Mongolia
12	Eszter Dudas	Hungary
14	Valeria Piedra	Ecuador
15	Laura Casey	Ireland
16	Viviana Gonzalez	Colombia
17	Raquel Rocha	Portugal
18	Elinor Thorogood	Great Britain
19	Anna Godoy Contreras	Spain
20	Karolina Solovyova	Kazakhstan
21	Andrea Brown	Zimbabwe
22	Andrea Longueria	Chile
23	Annie Thorén	Sweden
24	Christine Ridenour	Canada
25	Ellie Salthouse	Australia
26	Maddie Dillon	New Zealand
27	Hee Sun Kim	South Korea
28	Cristina Betancourt	Puerto Rico
29	Sara Vilic	Austria
30	Adriana Barraza	Mexico
31	Marlene Gomez-Weißhäupl	Germany
32	Fany Baysaron	Israel
33	Charlotte Deldaele	Belgium

== Medal summary ==
=== Medal table ===
Rank	Nation	Gold	Silver	Bronze	Total
1	Japan	1	0	0	1
1	New Zealand	1	0	0	1
3	United States	0	1	1	2
4	Australia	0	1	0	1
5	Austria	0	0	1	1
Totals (5 entries)		2	2	2	6

=== Events ===
Event	Gold	Silver	Bronze
Boys'	Aaron Barclay; New Zealand	Kevin McDowell; United States	Alois Knabl; Austria
Girls'	Yuka Sato; Japan	Ellie Salthouse; Australia	Kelly Whitley; United States
Mixed Relay	Europe 1 Eszter Dudas; Miguel Valente Fernandes; Fanny Beisaron; Alois Knabl	Oceania 1 Ellie Salthouse; Michael Gosman; Maddie Dillon; Aaron Barclay	Americas 1 Kelly Whitley; Kevin McDowell; Adriana Barraza; Lautaro Diaz
