= Gymnastics at the 2010 Summer Youth Olympics – Men's trampoline =

Men's trampoline competition at the 2010 Summer Youth Olympics was held on 20 August at the Bishan Sports Hall. The competition consisted of two rounds. In the first round, each trampolinist performed two routines on the trampoline. One routine had to include required elements, while the other was a voluntary routine. Scores were given for both execution and difficulty in each routine, summed to give a routine score. The two routine scores in the first round determined qualification for the second; the eight top finishers moved on to the final. The final consisted entirely of a single voluntary routine, with no preliminary scores being carried over.

== Medalists ==
Gold	Silver	Bronze
Oleksandr Satin; Ukraine	He Yuziang; China	Ginga Munetomo; Japan

== Qualification ==
Rank	Name	Routine 1	Routine 2	Total
1	He Yuxiang (CHN)	28.700	40.100	68.800
2	Oleksandr Satin (UKR)	28.100	40.200	68.300
3	Ginga Munetomo (JPN)	27.500	38.700	66.200
4	Oliver Amann (GER)	26.900	38.900	65.800
5	Nathan Bailey (GBR)	26.700	38.000	64.700
6	Alah Rabtsau (BLR)	26.300	37.400	63.700
7	Apostolos Koutavas (GRE)	28.000	35.100	63.100
8	Curtis Gerein (CAN)	26.500	35.900	62.400
9	Lucas Adorno (ARG)	23.300	33.800	57.100
10	Patrick Cooper (AUS)	25.600	13.200	38.800
11	Hunter Brewster (USA)	26.100	7.600	33.700
12	Reinhard Huisamen (RSA)	24.500	3.600	28.100

== Final ==
Rank	Name	Difficulty	Execution	Penalty	Total
Gold medal	Oleksandr Satin (UKR)	15.000	26.000		41.000
Silver medal	He Yuxiang (CHN)	14.700	26.000		40.700
Bronze medal	Ginga Munetomo (JPN)	14.700	25.300		40.000
4	Apostolos Koutavas (GRE)	15.000	24.200		39.200
5	Oliver Amann (GER)	14.800	23.700		38.500
6	Aleh Rabtsau (BLR)	14.300	23.000		37.300
7	Curtis Gerein (CAN)	13.900	22.900		36.800
8	Nathan Bailey (GBR)	4.700	7.300		12.000
