= Australia at the 2010 Summer Youth Olympics =

- IOC code: AUS
- NOC: Australian Olympic Committee
- Website: www.olympics.com.au

in Singapore
- Competitors: 100 in 20 sports
- Flag bearer: Elizabeth Parnov
- Medals Ranked 6th: Gold 8 Silver 13 Bronze 8 Total 29

Summer Youth Olympics appearances
- 2010; 2014; 2018; 2026

Australia competed at the 2010 Summer Youth Olympics, the inaugural Youth Olympic Games, held in Singapore from 14 August to 26 August 2010.

The Australian team consisted of the maximum number of allowed athletes (100) competing in 20 sports: archery, aquatics (diving and swimming), athletics, badminton, basketball, boxing, canoe/kayak, cycling, equestrian, gymnastics, handball, hockey, modern pentathlon, rowing, sailing, shooting, table tennis, triathlon, weightlifting and wrestling.

== Medalists ==
Australian medalists at the 2010 Summer Youth Olympics
Name	Medal	Sport	Event	Date
Nicholas Schafer	Gold	Swimming	Youth men's 100m breaststroke	16 August
Madison Wilson Emily Selig Zoe Johnson Emma McKeon	Gold	Swimming	Youth women's 4 × 100 m medley relay	16 August
Max Ackermann Nicholas Schafer Kenneth To Justin James	Gold	Swimming	Youth men's 4 × 100 m medley relay	18 August
Emily Selig	Gold	Swimming	Youth women's 200m breaststroke	20 August
Nicholas Hough	Gold	Athletics	Boys' 110m hurdles	21 August
Damien Hooper	Gold	Boxing	Men's Middle 75kg	25 August
Jessica Fox	Gold	Canoeing	K1 obstacle canoe slalom women	25 August
Australian Boys' Field Hockey team Rory Middleton Luke Noblett Flynn Ogilvie Jay Randhawa Byron Walton Jordan Willott Oscar Wookey Dylan Wotherspoon Daniel Beale Robert Bell Andrew Butturini Ryan Edge Jake Farrell Casey Hammond Jeremy Hayward Daniel Mathiesen	Gold	Field hockey	Boys' tournament	25 August
Ellie Salthouse	Silver	Triathlon	Women's triathlon	15 August
Kenneth To Emma McKeon Madison Wilson Justin James	Silver	Swimming	Mixed 4 × 100 m freestyle relay	15 August
Kenneth To	Silver	Swimming	Youth men's 200m individual medley	16 August
Emma McKeon	Silver	Swimming	Youth women's 100m freestyle	17 August
Emma Basher Olympia Aldersey	Silver	Rowing	Junior women's pair	18 August
Kenneth To	Silver	Swimming	Youth men's 50m freestyle	18 August
Emily Selig	Silver	Swimming	Youth women's 100m breaststroke	18 August
Nicholas Schafer	Silver	Swimming	Youth men's 50m breaststroke	20 August
Michelle Jenneke	Silver	Athletics	Girls' 100m hurdles	21 August
Brandon Starc	Silver	Athletics	Boys' high jump	21 August
Elizabeth Parnov	Silver	Athletics	Girls' pole vault	21 August
Olivia Bontempelli Hannah Kaser Mikhaela Donnelly Rosie Fadljevic	Silver	Basketball	Girls' Final	23 August
Brett Mather	Silver	Boxing	Men's Light 60kg	25 August
Matthew Cochran David Watts (rower)	Bronze	Rowing	Junior men's pair	18 August
Nicholas Schafer	Bronze	Swimming	Youth men's 200m breaststroke	18 August
Max Ackermann	Bronze	Swimming	Youth men's 50m backstroke	18 August
Emma McKeon	Bronze	Swimming	Youth women's 200m freestyle	18 August
Emma McKeon	Bronze	Swimming	Youth women's 50m freestyle	20 August
Kenneth To	Bronze	Swimming	Youth men's 100m freestyle	20 August
Max Ackermann Emily Selig Kenneth To Emma McKeon	Bronze	Swimming	Mixed 4 × 100 m medley relay	20 August
Angela Donald	Bronze	Gymnastics	Women's Beam	22 August

=== Mixed-NOCs medalists ===
Australian medalists in mixed-NOCs teams at the 2010 Summer Youth Olympics
Medal	Name	Sport	Event	Date
Ellie Salthouse Michael Gosman	Silver	Triathlon	Mixed relay	19 August
Thomas McDermott	Silver	Equestrian	Team jumping	20 August
Nicholas Hough Raheen Williams	Bronze	Athletics	Boy's medley relay	23 August

== Archery ==
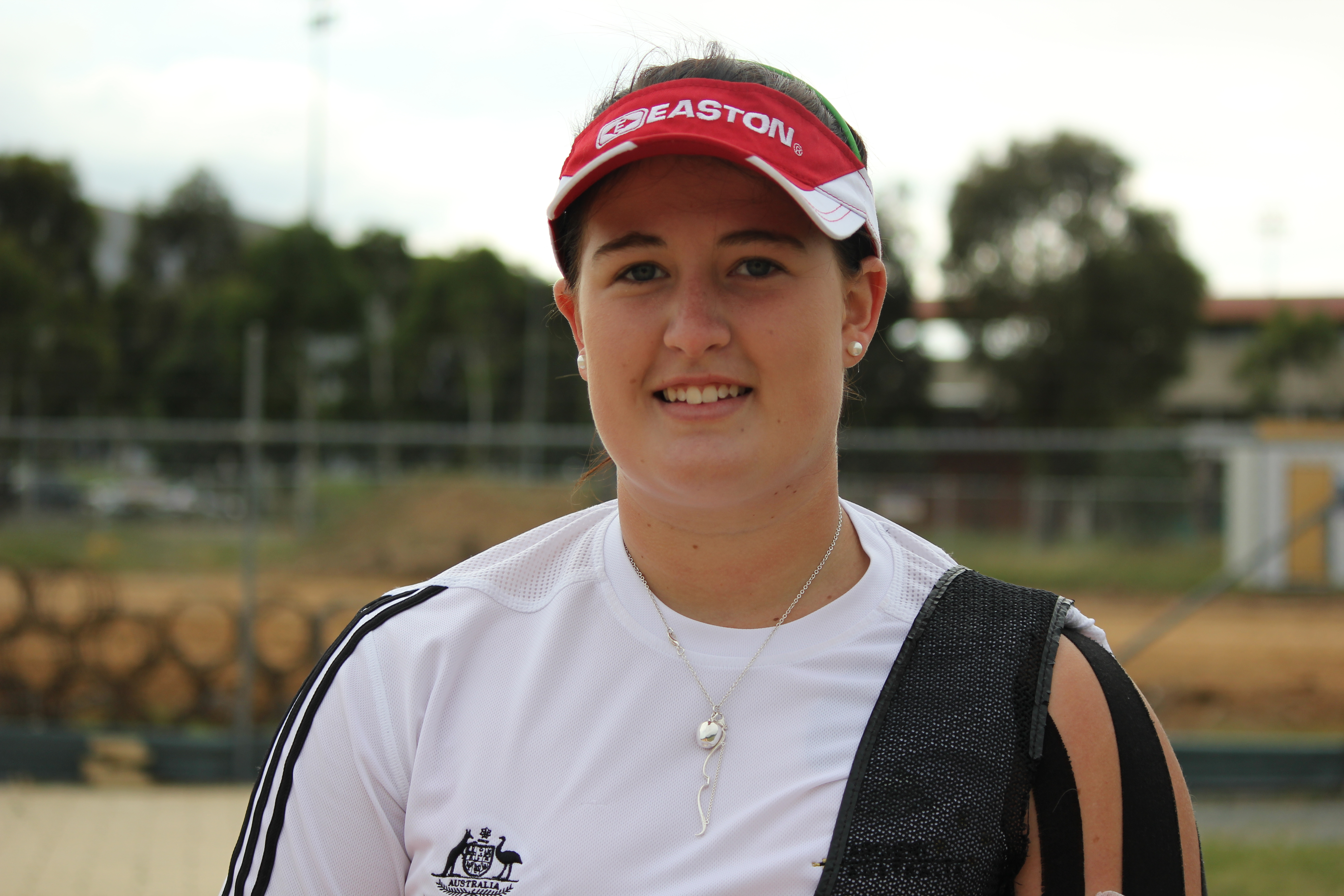
Alice Ingley competed in both the Girls' individual and Mixed team archery events.

Australian boys' archery team at the 2010 Summer Youth Olympics
Athlete	Event	Ranking round		Round of 32	Round of 16	Quarterfinals	Semifinals	Final	
Athlete	Event	Score	Seed	Opposition Score	Opposition Score	Opposition Score	Opposition Score	Opposition Score	Rank
Benjamin Nott	Boys' individual	634	9	Ipsen (DEN); W 6-4	Koiwa (JPN); W 6-4	Oever (NED); L 4-6	Did not advance		5

Australian girls' archery team at the 2010 Summer Youth Olympics
Athlete	Event	Ranking round		Round of 32	Round of 16	Quarterfinals	Semifinals	Final	
Athlete	Event	Score	Seed	Opposition Score	Opposition Score	Opposition Score	Opposition Score	Opposition Score	Rank
Alice Ingley	Girls' individual	560	24	Filippi (ITA); W 6-4	Mirca (MDA); L 4-6	Did not advance			9

Australian representatives in mixed-NOCs archery events at the 2010 Summer Youth Olympics
Athlete	Event	Partner	Round of 32	Round of 16	Quarterfinals	Semifinals	Final	
Athlete	Event	Partner	Opposition Score	Opposition Score	Opposition Score	Opposition Score	Opposition Score	Rank
Alice Ingley	Mixed team	Tsukushi Koiwa (JPN)	Viehmeier (GER)/ Park (CAN); W 7-3	Kamel (EGY)/ Oever (NED); W 7-3	Milon (BAN)/ Alarcón (ESP); L 5-6	Did not advance		5
Benjamin Nott	Mixed team	Brina Bozic (SLO)	Sichenikova (UKR)/ Chu (USA); W 6-5	Loh (SIN)/ Rivas (ESP); W 6-4	Unsal (TUR)/ Mohamed (SIN); L 2-6	Did not advance		7

== Athletics ==
=== Boys ===
Track and road events

Athletes	Event	Qualification		Final	
Athletes	Event	Result	Rank	Result	Rank
Luke Greco	Boys’ 400m	50.82	16 qC	50.76	17
Rick Whitehead	Boys’ 1000m	2:27.81	13 qB	2:27.20	13
Nicholas Hough	Boys’ 110m hurdles	13.50	1 Q	13.37	Gold medal
Raheen Williams	Boys’ 400m hurdles	53.11	7 Q	52.86	6
Grant Gwynne	Boys’ 2000m Steeplechase	6:16.83	11 qB	6:18.41	12
Blake Steele	Boys’ 10km walk			48:00.85	11
Lepani Naivalu (FIJ); John Rivan (PNG); Nicholas Hough (AUS); Raheen Williams (AUS)	Boys’ medley relay			1:52.71	Bronze medal

Field events

Athletes	Event	Qualification		Final	
Athletes	Event	Result	Rank	Result	Rank
Damien Birkinhead	Boys’ shot put	20.89	3 Q	20.55	4
Elliott Lang	Boys’ javelin throw	68.83	9 qB	65.91	13
Kurt Jenner	Boys’ long jump	7.10	9 qB	7.08	10
Brandon Starc	Boys’ high jump	2.10	1 Q	2.19	Silver medal
Brodie Cross	Boys’ pole vault	4.45	12 qB	4.50	11

=== Girls ===
Track and road events

Athletes	Event	Qualification		Final	
Athletes	Event	Result	Rank	Result	Rank
Monica Brennan	Girls’ 200m	24.69	8 Q	24.83	8
Jenny Blundell	Girls’ 1000m	2:46.58	5 Q	2:46.82	5
Michelle Jenneke	Girls’ 100m hurdles	13.65	3 Q	13.46	Silver medal
Michelle Jenneke (AUS); Monica Brennan (AUS); Hazel Bowering-Scott (NZL); Jenny Blundell (AUS)	Girls’ medley relay			2:13.96	4

Field events

Athletes	Event	Qualification		Final	
Athletes	Event	Result	Rank	Result	Rank
Prabhjot Rai	Girls’ shot put	13.56	10 qB	13.30	12
Demii Maher-Smith	Girls’ long jump	5.67	11 qB	5.62	11
Elizabeth Parnov	Girls’ pole vault	3.90	5 Q	4.25	Silver medal

== Badminton ==
Boys

Athlete	Event	Group stage				Knock-Out Stage			
Athlete	Event	Match 1	Match 2	Match 3	Rank	Quarterfinal	Semifinal	Final	Rank
Boris Ma	Boys’ singles	Lehikoinen (FIN) L 0-2 (4-21, 5-21)	Kariyawasam (SRI) L 0-2 (14-21, 5-21)	Hsieh (TPE) L 0-2 (5-21, 12-21)	4	Did not advance			

Girls

Athlete	Event	Group stage				Knock-Out Stage			
Athlete	Event	Match 1	Match 2	Match 3	Rank	Quarterfinal	Semifinal	Final	Rank
Tara Pilven	Girls’ singles	Marín (ESP) L 0-2 (8-21, 9-21)	Volkanovska (MKD) W 2-0 (21-7, 21-3)	Mikkela (FIN) L 0-2 (18-21, 16-21)	3	Did not advance			

== Basketball ==
Girls

Squad list	Event	Group stage		Placement stage			Rank
Squad list	Event	Group D	Rank	1st-8th	1st-4th	1st-2nd	Rank
Rosemary Fadljevic; Mikhaela Donnelly; Hannah Kaser; Olivia Bontempelli (C)	Girls' basketball	Chile; W 18-9	1	Brazil; W 23-20	United States; W 25-23	China; L 29-33	Silver medal
Rosemary Fadljevic; Mikhaela Donnelly; Hannah Kaser; Olivia Bontempelli (C)	Girls' basketball	France; W 21-15	1	Brazil; W 23-20	United States; W 25-23	China; L 29-33	Silver medal
Rosemary Fadljevic; Mikhaela Donnelly; Hannah Kaser; Olivia Bontempelli (C)	Girls' basketball	Japan; L 10-17	1	Brazil; W 23-20	United States; W 25-23	China; L 29-33	Silver medal
Rosemary Fadljevic; Mikhaela Donnelly; Hannah Kaser; Olivia Bontempelli (C)	Girls' basketball	Italy; W 29-15	1	Brazil; W 23-20	United States; W 25-23	China; L 29-33	Silver medal

== Boxing ==
Boys

Athlete	Event	Preliminaries	Semifinals	Final	Rank
Brett Mather	Lightweight (60kg)		Daniel Echeverria (MEX); W 8-7	Evaldas Petrauskas (LTU); L 4-13	Silver medal
Damien Hooper	Middleweight (75kg)	Joe Ward (IRL); W 4-2	Zoltán Harcsa (HUN); W 4-0	Juan Carlos Carrillo (COL); W 12-4	Gold medal

== Canoeing ==
Boys

Athlete	Event	Time Trial		Round 1	Round 2 (Rep)	Round 3	Round 4	Round 5	Final
Athlete	Event	Time	Rank	Round 1	Round 2 (Rep)	Round 3	Round 4	Round 5	Final
Scott Smith	Boys’ K1 slalom	1:31.80	5	Dipoko (CMR); W 1:30.55-1:46.61		Stowman (RSA); W 1:31.65-1:46.22	Urban (SVK); L 1:35.57-1:28.02	Did not advance	
Scott Smith	Boys’ K1 sprint	1:33.75	11	Ooi (SIN); W 1:32.66-1:32.90		Garcia (ESP); L 1:34.31-1:32.70	Did not advance		

Girls

Athlete	Event	Time Trial		Round 1	Round 2 (Rep)	Round 3	Round 4	Round 5	Final	Rank
Athlete	Event	Time	Rank	Round 1	Round 2 (Rep)	Round 3	Round 4	Round 5	Final	Rank
Jessica Fox	Girls’ K1 slalom	1:34.23	1			Hryshyna (BLR); W 1:37.10-2:01.26	Peters (BEL); W 1:34.62-1:46.52	Novak (SLO); W 1:37.30-1:45.06	Zasterova (CZE); W 1:33.64-1:40.79	Gold medal
Jessica Fox	Girls’ K1 sprint	1:46.15	8	Wang (SIN); W 1:46.54-1:50.14		Hryshyna (BLR); L 1:46.60-1:45.27	Did not advance			

== Cycling ==
Cross Country

Athlete	Event	Time	Rank	Points
Michael Baker	Boys’ Cross Country	-2LAP	27	72
Kirsten Dellar	Girls’ Cross Country	-2LAP	28	40

Time Trial

Athlete	Event	Time	Rank	Points
Jay McCarthy	Boys’ Time Trial	3:59.63	2	4
Kirsten Dellar	Girls’ Time Trial	3:39.09	15	38

BMX

Athlete	Event	Seeding Round		Quarterfinals							Semifinals							Final		
Athlete	Event	Seeding Round		Run 1		Run 2		Run 3		Rank	Run 1		Run 2		Run 3		Rank	Final		
Athlete	Event	Time	Rank	Time	Rank	Time	Rank	Time	Rank	Rank	Time	Rank	Time	Rank	Time	Rank	Rank	Time	Rank	Points
Matthew Dunsworth	Boys’ BMX	31.656	4	32.467	2	32.703	2	31.959	1	2 Q	32.693	3	52.495	6	34.738	8	5	Did not advance		54
Kirsten Dellar	Girls’ BMX	36.757	2	38.448	1	38.138	1	36.978	1	1 Q	37.353	1	37.765	2	38.284	2	2 Q	36.133	2	5

Road race

Athlete	Event	Time	Rank	Points
Jay McCarthy	Boys’ Road race	1:05:44	19	67*
Michael Baker	Boys’ Road race	1:05:44	43	
Matthew Dunsworth	Boys’ Road race	1:16:48	61	

Overall

Team	Event	Cross Country Pts		Time Trial Pts		BMX Pts		Road race Pts	Total	Rank
Team	Event	Boys	Girls	Boys	Girls	Boys	Girls	Road race Pts	Total	Rank
Kirsten Dellar; Michael Baker; Jay McCarthy; Matthew Dunsworth	Mixed team	72	40	4	38	54	5	67*	280	11

- * Received -5 for finishing road race with all three racers

== Diving ==
Athlete	Event	Preliminary		Final	
Athlete	Event	Points	Rank	Points	Rank
Hannah Thek	Girls’ 3m springboard	385.70	6 Q	428.00	5
Hannah Thek	Girls’ 10m platform	390.80	4 Q	375.75	7

== Equestrian ==
Athlete	horse	Event	Round 1			Round 2			Total	Jump-Off		Rank
Athlete	horse	Event	Penalties		Rank	Penalties		Rank	Total	Penalties	Time	Rank
Athlete	horse	Event	Jump	Time	Rank	Jump	Time	Rank	Total	Penalties	Time	Rank
Thomas McDermott	Hugo	individual jumping	0	0	1	4	0	8	4	8	52.18	8
Jasmine Zin Man Lai (HKG); Jake Lambert (NZL); Xu Zhengyang (CHN); Sultan Al Tooqi (OMA); Thomas McDermott (AUS)	Butterfly Kisses; Le Lucky; Foxdale Villarni; Joondooree Farms Damiro; Hugo	Team jumping	~~12~~; 0; ~~16~~; 4; 0	~~0~~; 0; ~~0~~; 0; 0	1	4; 0; ~~20~~; ~~4~~; 0	0; 0; ~~0~~; ~~0~~; 0	2	8	0; ~~12~~; 0; 4; ~~8~~	50.57; ~~46.13~~; 51.46; 52.23; ~~46.10~~	Silver medal

== Gymnastics ==
=== Artistic gymnastics ===
Boys

Athlete	Event	Floor		pommel horse		Rings		vault		parallel Bars		Horizontal Bar		Total	
Athlete	Event	Score	Rank	Score	Rank	Score	Rank	Score	Rank	Score	Rank	Score	Rank	Score	Rank
Brody-Jai Hennessy	Boys' Qualification	12.400	37	11.700	33	13.750	14	14.950	23	13.250	19	13.800	8 Q	79.850	27

Athlete	Event	Score	Rank
Brody-Jai Hennessy	Boys' Horizontal Bar	11.700	8

Girls

Athlete	Event	vault		uneven bars		Beam		Floor		Total	
Athlete	Event	Score	Rank	Score	Rank	Score	Rank	Score	Rank	Score	Rank
Angela Donald	Girls' Qualification	13.300	19	13.250	8 Q	14.400	4 Q	13.100	10	54.050	7 Q
Angela Donald	Girls' individual all-around	13.200	18	13.100	8	13.800	7	13.200	7	53.300	7

Athlete	Event	Score	Rank
Angela Donald	Girls' uneven bars	12.975	4
Angela Donald	Girls' Beam	14.450	Bronze medal

=== Rhythmic gymnastics ===
Individual

Athlete	Event	Qualification						Final					
Athlete	Event	Rope	Hoop	Ball	Clubs	Total	Rank	Rope	Hoop	Ball	Clubs	Total	Rank
Taylor Tirohardjo	Girls' individual all-around	20.500	20.400	20.475	20.275	81.650	16	Did not advance					

Team

Athlete	Event	Qualification				Final			
Athlete	Event	Hoops	Ribbons	Total	Rank	Hoops	Ribbons	Total	Rank
Soriah Maclean; Fotini Panselinos; Morgan Turner; Summer Walker	Girls' Group all-around	18.650	18.500	27.150	6	Did not advance			

=== Trampoline ===
Athlete	Event	Qualification				Final	
Athlete	Event	Routine 1	Routine 2	Total	Rank	Routine 1	Rank
Patrick Cooper	Boys' trampoline	25.600	13.200	38.800	10	Did not advance	
Madeleine Johnson	Girls' trampoline	26.100	32.300	58.400	7 Q	33.400	6

== Handball ==
Squad list	Event	Group stage		5th place playoffs		Rank
Squad list	Event	Group B	Rank	1st Match	2nd Match	Rank
Taylee Lewis; Alice Keighley; Annalese Smith; Sally Cash; Paulini Tawamacala; Jasmin Huriwai; Bella Faasau; Maddison Truesdale; Tegan Poulton; Brianna Keyes; Victoria Fletcher; Claire Dennerley; Holly Tupper; Monica Najdovski	Girls' Handball	Denmark; L 4-41	3	Angola; L 12-37	Angola; L 12-39	6
Taylee Lewis; Alice Keighley; Annalese Smith; Sally Cash; Paulini Tawamacala; Jasmin Huriwai; Bella Faasau; Maddison Truesdale; Tegan Poulton; Brianna Keyes; Victoria Fletcher; Claire Dennerley; Holly Tupper; Monica Najdovski	Girls' Handball	Kazakhstan; L 16-45	3	Angola; L 12-37	Angola; L 12-39	6

== Hockey ==
Squad list	Event	Group stage		Final	
Squad list	Event	Opposition Score	Rank	Opposition Score	Rank
Daniel Beale; Robert Bell; Andrew Butturini; Ryan Edge; Jake Farrell (C); Casey Hammond; Jeremy Hayward; Daniel Mathiesen; Rory Middleton; Luke Noblett; Flynn Ogilvie; Jayshaan Randhawa; Byron Walton; Jordan Willott; Oscar Wookey; Dylan Wotherspoon	Boys' Hockey	Singapore; W 8-1	1	Pakistan; W 2-1	Gold medal
Daniel Beale; Robert Bell; Andrew Butturini; Ryan Edge; Jake Farrell (C); Casey Hammond; Jeremy Hayward; Daniel Mathiesen; Rory Middleton; Luke Noblett; Flynn Ogilvie; Jayshaan Randhawa; Byron Walton; Jordan Willott; Oscar Wookey; Dylan Wotherspoon	Boys' Hockey	Ghana; W 8-0	1	Pakistan; W 2-1	Gold medal
Daniel Beale; Robert Bell; Andrew Butturini; Ryan Edge; Jake Farrell (C); Casey Hammond; Jeremy Hayward; Daniel Mathiesen; Rory Middleton; Luke Noblett; Flynn Ogilvie; Jayshaan Randhawa; Byron Walton; Jordan Willott; Oscar Wookey; Dylan Wotherspoon	Boys' Hockey	Belgium; W 6-3	1	Pakistan; W 2-1	Gold medal
Daniel Beale; Robert Bell; Andrew Butturini; Ryan Edge; Jake Farrell (C); Casey Hammond; Jeremy Hayward; Daniel Mathiesen; Rory Middleton; Luke Noblett; Flynn Ogilvie; Jayshaan Randhawa; Byron Walton; Jordan Willott; Oscar Wookey; Dylan Wotherspoon	Boys' Hockey	Pakistan; W 5-2	1	Pakistan; W 2-1	Gold medal
Daniel Beale; Robert Bell; Andrew Butturini; Ryan Edge; Jake Farrell (C); Casey Hammond; Jeremy Hayward; Daniel Mathiesen; Rory Middleton; Luke Noblett; Flynn Ogilvie; Jayshaan Randhawa; Byron Walton; Jordan Willott; Oscar Wookey; Dylan Wotherspoon	Boys' Hockey	Chile; W 9-0	1	Pakistan; W 2-1	Gold medal

== Modern pentathlon ==
Athlete	Event	Fencing (épée one touch)			Swimming (200m freestyle)			Running & Shooting (3000m, Laser Pistol)			Total points	Final rank
Athlete	Event	Results	Rank	Points	Time	Rank	Points	Time	Rank	Points	Total points	Final rank
Todd Renfree	Boys individual	5-18	24	560	2:21.65	24	1104	12:24.70	21	2024	3688	24
Anna Maliszewska (POL); Todd Renfree (AUS)	Mixed relay	50-42	6	860	2:11.65	22	1224	15:50.67	11	2280	4364	11

== Rowing ==
Athlete	Event	Heats		Repechage		Semifinals		Final	
Athlete	Event	Time	Rank	Time	Rank	Time	Rank	Time	Overall Rank
Matthew Cochran; David Watts	Boys' pair	3:10.92	1 QA/B			3:17.50	1 QA	3:07.52	Bronze medal
Emma Basher; Olympia Aldersey	Girls' pair	3:30.09	1 QA/B			3:36.83	1 QA	3:29.34	Silver medal

== Sailing ==
One Person Dinghy

Athlete	Event	Race												Points	Rank
Athlete	Event	1	2	3	4	5	6	7	8	9	10	11	M*	Points	Rank
Mark Spearman	Boys' Byte CII	4	16	~~18~~	14	8	13	6	10	~~26~~	17	12	15	115	13
Madison Kennedy	Girls' Byte CII	19	14	5	10	13	18	15	19	~~22~~	20	~~24~~	14	147	19

== Shooting ==
Pistol

Athlete	Event	Qualification		Final		
Athlete	Event	Score	Rank	Score	Total	Rank
Janek Janski	Boys' 10m air pistol	554	17	Did not advance		
Emily Esposito	Girls' 10m air pistol	367	15	Did not advance		

Rifle

Athlete	Event	Qualification		Final		
Athlete	Event	Score	Rank	Score	Total	Rank
John Coombes	Boys' 10m air rifle	586	11	Did not advance		

== Swimming ==
Boys

Athletes	Event	Heat		Semifinal		Final	
Athletes	Event	Time	Position	Time	Position	Time	Position
Justin James	Boys’ 100m freestyle	51.62	10 Q	51.44	8 Q	51.21	8
Justin James	Boys’ 200m freestyle	1:52.51	12			Did not advance	
Justin James	Boys’ 400m freestyle	4:03.46	14			Did not advance	
Justin James	Boys’ 100m butterfly	55.70	17	Did not advance			
Kenneth To	Boys’ 50m freestyle	22.94	2 Q	22.70	2 Q	22.82	Silver medal
Kenneth To	Boys’ 100m freestyle	50.67	1 Q	49.96	1 Q	50.29	Bronze medal
Kenneth To	Boys’ 100m breaststroke	1:03.49	5	Withdrew			
Kenneth To	Boys’ 100m butterfly	54.16	1 Q	54.36	10	Did not advance	
Kenneth To	Boys’ 200m individual medley	2:02.42	1 Q			2:02.51	Silver medal
Max Ackermann	Boys’ 50m backstroke			26.63	6 Q	26.46	Bronze medal
Max Ackermann	Boys’ 100m backstroke	57.64	9 Q	57.63	11	Did not advance	
Max Ackermann	Boys’ 200m backstroke	2:09.18	15			Did not advance	
Nicholas Schafer	Boys’ 50m breaststroke	28.82	2 Q	28.83	1 Q	28.59	Silver medal
Nicholas Schafer	Boys’ 100m breaststroke	1:02.09	1 Q	1:01.51	1 Q	1:01.38	Gold medal
Nicholas Schafer	Boys’ 200m breaststroke	2:14.64	1 Q			2:13.72	Bronze medal
Justin James; Kenneth To; Nicholas Schafer; Max Ackermann	Boys’ 4 × 100 m freestyle relay	3:25.91	1 Q			3:25.51	4
Justin James; Kenneth To; Nicholas Schafer; Max Ackermann	Boys’ 4 × 100 m medley relay	3:45.05	1 Q			3:42.50	Gold medal

Girls

Athletes	Event	Heat		Semifinal		Final	
Athletes	Event	Time	Position	Time	Position	Time	Position
Emily Selig	Girls’ 100m breaststroke	1:10.57	2 Q	1:09.84	2 Q	1:09.06	Silver medal
Emily Selig	Girls’ 200m breaststroke	2:30.56	1 Q			2:27.78	Gold medal
Emily Selig	Girls’ 200m individual medley	2:22.15	11			Did not advance	
Emma McKeon	Girls’ 50m freestyle	25.85	2 Q	25.60	2 Q	25.61	Bronze medal
Emma McKeon	Girls’ 100m freestyle	56.04	1 Q	55.64	1 Q	55.37	Silver medal
Emma McKeon	Girls’ 200m freestyle	2:03.78	6 Q			2:01.18	Bronze medal
Emma McKeon	Girls’ 400m freestyle	DNS				Did not advance	
Madison Wilson	Girls’ 100m backstroke	1:05.54	19	Did not advance			
Madison Wilson	Girls’ 200m backstroke	2:26.76	30			Did not advance	
Zoe Johnson	Girls’ 50m butterfly	28.40	11 Q	28.43	12	Did not advance	
Zoe Johnson	Girls’ 100m butterfly	1:02.31	16 Q	1:02.24	14	Did not advance	
Zoe Johnson	Girls’ 200m butterfly	2:21.54	20			Did not advance	
Madison Wilson; Zoe Johnson; Emily Selig; Emma McKeon	Girls’ 4 × 100 m freestyle relay	3:54.64	4 Q			3:51.81	4
Madison Wilson; Zoe Johnson; Emily Selig; Emma McKeon	Girls’ 4 × 100 m medley relay	4:13.12	1 Q			4:09.68	Gold medal

Mixed

Athletes	Event	Heat		Semifinal		Final	
Athletes	Event	Time	Position	Time	Position	Time	Position
Kenneth To; Emma McKeon; Madison Wilson; Justin James	Mixed 4 × 100 m freestyle relay	3:34.67	1 Q			3:31.69	Silver medal
Nicholas Schafer*; Zoe Johnson*; Madison Wilson*; Justin James*; Max Ackermann; Emily Selig; Kenneth To; Emma McKeon	Mixed 4 × 100 m medley relay	3:59.14	2 Q			3:55.63	Bronze medal

- * Swimmers used in heats only

== Table tennis ==
Individual

Athlete	Event	Round 1		Round 2		Quarterfinals	Semifinals	Final	Rank
Athlete	Event	Group matches	Rank	Group matches	Rank	Quarterfinals	Semifinals	Final	Rank
Lily Phan	Girls' singles	Meshref (EGY); L 0-3 (6-11, 7-11, 6-11)	4 qB	Baravok (BLR); L 1-3 (7-11, 11-8, 4-11, 4-11)	3	Did not advance			25
Lily Phan	Girls' singles	Galic (SLO); L 0-3 (18-20, 11-13, 9-11)	4 qB	Rosheuvel (GUY); W 3-0 (11-5, 11-5, 11-6)	3	Did not advance			25
Lily Phan	Girls' singles	Jeger (CRO); L 1-3 (4-11, 11-5, 5-11, 10-12)	4 qB	Pang (FRA); L 0-3 (7-11, 10-12, 10-12)	3	Did not advance			25

Team

Athlete	Event	Round 1		Round 2	Quarterfinals	Semifinals	Final	Rank
Athlete	Event	Group matches	Rank	Round 2	Quarterfinals	Semifinals	Final	Rank
Intercontinental 3 Lily Phan (AUS); Luis Mejia (ESA)	Mixed team	Europe 2 Xiao (POR); Vanrossomme (BEL); L 0-3 (0-3, 0-3, 0-3)	4 qB	Europe 3 Loveridge (GBR); Mutti (ITA); L 0-2 (2-3, 0-3)	Did not advance			25
Intercontinental 3 Lily Phan (AUS); Luis Mejia (ESA)	Mixed team	Europe 6 Galic (SLO); Stefan Leitgeb (AUT); L 0-3 (0-3, 1-3, 0-3)	4 qB	Europe 3 Loveridge (GBR); Mutti (ITA); L 0-2 (2-3, 0-3)	Did not advance			25
Intercontinental 3 Lily Phan (AUS); Luis Mejia (ESA)	Mixed team	France; Pang (FRA); Gauzy (FRA); L 0-3 (0-3, 0-3, 0-3)	4 qB	Europe 3 Loveridge (GBR); Mutti (ITA); L 0-2 (2-3, 0-3)	Did not advance			25

== Triathlon ==
Girls

Triathlete	Event	Swimming	Transit 1	Cycling	Transit 2	Running	Total time	Rank
Ellie Salthouse	individual	10:07	0:35	31:34	0:26	18:22	1:01:04.39	2nd place, silver medalist(s)

Men's

Athlete	Event	Swim (1.5 km)	Trans 1	Bike (40 km)	Trans 2	Run (10 km)	Total	Rank
Michael Gosman	individual	9:19	0:31	29:24	0:27	17:21	57:02.83	12

Mixed

Athlete	Event	Total times per athlete (swim 250 m, bike 7 km, run 1.7 km)	Total group time	Rank
Ellie Salthouse (AUS); Michael Gosman (AUS); Maddie Dillon (NZL); Aaron Barclay (NZL)	Mixed team relay Oceania 1	20:36; 19:07; 21:11; 19:01	1:19:55.23	2nd place, silver medalist(s)

== Weightlifting ==
Athlete	Event	Snatch	Clean & jerk	Total	Rank
Liam Larkins	Boys' 77kg	92	120	212	8
Michelle Kahi	Girls' 63kg	74	92	166	6

== Wrestling ==
Freestyle

Athlete	Event	Pools		Final	Rank
Athlete	Event	Groups	Rank	Final	Rank
Jayden Lawrence	Boys' 54kg	Herandez (COL); L 0–2 (0–3, 1–3)	3	5th place match Serrata (DOM); W 2–1 (6–0, 0-8, 6–3)	5
Jayden Lawrence	Boys' 54kg	Leung (SIN); W T. Fall (6–0, 6–0)	3	5th place match Serrata (DOM); W 2–1 (6–0, 0-8, 6–3)	5
Jayden Lawrence	Boys' 54kg	Guluyev (AZE); L Fall (1–7)	3	5th place match Serrata (DOM); W 2–1 (6–0, 0-8, 6–3)	5
Haris Fazlic	Boys' 63kg	Pshnatlov (RUS); L Fall (0–3)	4	7th place match Pereira (GBS); L 0–2 (2–5, 3–6)	8
Haris Fazlic	Boys' 63kg	Mosidze (GEO); L T. Fall (0–7, 0–9)	4	7th place match Pereira (GBS); L 0–2 (2–5, 3–6)	8
Haris Fazlic	Boys' 63kg	Pilay (ECU); L 0–2 (0–1, 0–6)	4	7th place match Pereira (GBS); L 0–2 (2–5, 3–6)	8
Carissa Holland	Girls' 46kg	Mertens (GER); L 0–2 (0–4, 0–3)	3	5th place match Segura (VEN); L 0–2 (0–4, 0–5)	6
Carissa Holland	Girls' 46kg	Gannouni (TUN); W Fall (0–3, 5–3)	3	5th place match Segura (VEN); L 0–2 (0–4, 0–5)	6
Carissa Holland	Girls' 46kg	Leorda (MDA); L 0–2 (0–6, 0–4)	3	5th place match Segura (VEN); L 0–2 (0–4, 0–5)	6
