= Athletics at the 2010 Summer Youth Olympics – Girls' long jump =

Athletics – Girls' long jump at the I Summer Youth Olympic Games
- Venue: Bishan Stadium
- Date: August 17–21
- Competitors: 15 from 15 nations

Medalists
1st place, gold medalist(s)		Lena Malkus	Germany
2nd place, silver medalist(s)		Alina Rotaru	Romania
3rd place, bronze medalist(s)		Le'Tristan Pledger	United States

The girls' long jump event at the 2010 Youth Olympic Games was held on 17–21 August 2010 in Bishan Stadium, Singapore.

== Schedule ==
Date	Time	Round
17 August 2010	10:30	Qualification
21 August 2010	19:10	Final

== Results ==
=== Qualification ===
Rank	Athlete	1	2	3	4	Result	Notes	Q
1	Alina Rotaru (ROU)	x	6.40	x	-	6.40	PB	FA
2	Kaia Soosaar (EST)	5.96	x	6.04	5.80	6.04		FA
3	Le'Tristan Pledger (USA)	6.01	5.61	6.01	5.66	6.01		FA
4	Lena Malkus (GER)	5.58	x	x	6.00	6.00		FA
5	Yuka Takahashi (JPN)	5.91	5.99	5.84	5.70	5.99		FA
6	Ivona Dadic (AUT)	5.93	5.56	4.42	5.79	5.93		FA
7	Maryke Brits (RSA)	5.72	5.88	5.54	x	5.88		FA
8	Janieve Russell (JAM)	5.71	5.78	5.87	5.72	5.87		FA
9	Andressa Fidelis (BRA)	5.66	5.78	5.85	5.84	5.85		FB
10	Anna Visibelli (ITA)	3.85	5.81	5.19	5.54	5.81		FB
11	Demii Maher-Smith (AUS)	5.49	5.54	5.67	5.67	5.67		FB
12	Claudia Hladikova (SVK)	5.27	x	5.29	5.61	5.61		FB
13	Ana Martin-Sacristan (ESP)	x	5.51	x	5.40	5.51		FB
14	Rachel Romu (CAN)	5.50	5.45	5.44	5.44	5.50		FB
15	Pennapa Tantragool (THA)	4.91	5.08	5.07	x	5.08		FB

=== Finals ===
==== Final B ====
Rank	Athlete	1	2	3	4	Result	Notes
1	Anna Visibelli (ITA)	5.64	5.93	5.86	6.00	6.00	
2	Rachel Romu (CAN)	5.47	5.69	5.79	5.58	5.79	PB
3	Demii Maher-Smith (AUS)	5.53	5.62	5.48	5.48	5.62	
4	Ana Martin-Sacristan (ESP)	5.50	5.56	x	5.52	5.56	
5	Andressa Fidelis (BRA)	5.43	5.44	5.19	5.45	5.45	
6	Claudia Hladikova (SVK)	5.45	x	5.42	x	5.45	
7	Pennapa Tantragool (THA)	4.99	5.24	5.21	5.06	5.24	

==== Final A ====
Rank	Athlete	1	2	3	4	Result	Notes
1st place, gold medalist(s)	Lena Malkus (GER)	6.40	6.36	4.61	x	6.40	
2nd place, silver medalist(s)	Alina Rotaru (ROU)	6.32	6.31	x	6.38	6.38	
3rd place, bronze medalist(s)	Le'Tristan Pledger (USA)	5.71	5.69	6.17	5.88	6.17	PB
4	Kaia Soosaar (EST)	x	x	6.10	6.15	6.15	PB
5	Yuka Takahashi (JPN)	6.02	6.08	6.00	6.05	6.08	PB
6	Ivona Dadic (AUT)	5.62	5.77	5.78	5.91	5.91	
7	Janieve Russell (JAM)	5.75	x	5.83	x	5.83	
8	Maryke Brits (RSA)	5.49	5.12	5.71	x	5.71	
