= Athletics at the 2010 Summer Youth Olympics – Boys' javelin throw =

Athletics – Boys' javelin throw at the I Summer Youth Olympic Games
- Venue: Bishan Stadium
- Date: August 18–22
- Competitors: 15 from 15 nations

Medalists
1st place, gold medalist(s)		Braian Toledo	Argentina
2nd place, silver medalist(s)		Devin Bogert	United States
3rd place, bronze medalist(s)		Intars Isejevs	Latvia

The boys' javelin throw competition at the 2010 Youth Olympic Games was held on 18–22 August 2010 in Bishan Stadium.

== Schedule ==
Date	Time	Round
18 August 2010	09:00	Qualification
22 August 2010	09:00	Final

== Results ==
=== Qualification ===
Rank	Athlete	1	2	3	4	Result	Notes	Q
1	Braian Toledo (ARG)	73.90	72.04	69.93	77.27	77.27		FA
2	Marius Simanavicius (LTU)	64.05	68.91	67.28	76.17	76.17	PB	FA
3	Devin Bogert (USA)	74.24	–	–	–	74.24	PB	FA
4	Ali Kilisli (TUR)	73.64	x	64.53	–	73.64	PB	FA
5	Intars Isejevs (LAT)	61.59	64.34	73.42	–	73.42	PB	FA
6	Dylan Jacobs (RSA)	67.97	67.38	71.92	–	71.92	PB	FA
7	Fadl Ibrahim (EGY)	61.47	67.94	67.59	70.89	70.89	PB	FA
8	Yandris Vazquez Pompa (CUB)	64.91	55.77	62.69	69.06	69.06	PB	FA
9	Elliott Lang (AUS)	65.37	68.83	66.88	56.61	68.83	PB	FB
10	Yuriy Kushniruk (UKR)	x	60.01	68.77	57.38	68.77		FB
11	Chao-Tsun Cheng (TPE)	68.27	65.63	64.72	x	68.27		FB
12	Joosep Piho (EST)	49.18	46.97	63.15	66.70	66.70	PB	FB
13	Vladislav Podtsuk (KAZ)	59.76	62.94	63.58	65.69	65.69	PB	FB
14	Evgheni Glusco (MDA)	x	63.76	60.08	65.57	65.57	PB	FB
15	Tuomas Keto (FIN)	51.80	x	65.56	56.93	65.56		FB

=== Finals ===
==== Final B ====
Rank	Athlete	1	2	3	4	Result	Notes
1	Tuomas Keto (FIN)	63.06	64.10	78.03	66.27	78.03	PB
2	Yuriy Kushniruk (UKR)	x	61.62	70.80	70.94	70.94	
3	Evgheni Glusco (MDA)	69.75	x	x	66.10	69.75	PB
4	Chao-Tsun Cheng (TPE)	61.19	x	x	65.94	65.94	
5	Elliott Lang (AUS)	65.24	60.93	65.91	63.18	65.91	
6	Vladislav Podtsuk (KAZ)	56.11	62.61	59.26	63.87	63.87	
7	Joosep Piho (EST)	57.31	37.02	x	x	57.31	PB

==== Final A ====
Rank	Athlete	1	2	3	4	Result	Notes
1st place, gold medalist(s)	Braian Toledo (ARG)	81.78	77.65	x	x	81.78	
2nd place, silver medalist(s)	Devin Bogert (USA)	x	70.79	65.15	76.88	76.88	PB
3rd place, bronze medalist(s)	Intars Isejevs (LAT)	x	74.23	71.49	74.13	74.23	PB
4	Dylan Jacobs (RSA)	63.87	72.33	66.15	x	72.33	PB
5	Ali Kilisli (TUR)	72.30	x	62.85	x	72.30	
6	Marius Simanavicius (LTU)	x	71.76	x	x	71.76	
7	Fadl Ibrahim (EGY)	70.89	x	63.80	67.51	70.89	=PB
8	Yandris Vazquez Pompa (CUB)	x	x	68.65	62.14	68.65	
