= Argentina at the 2010 Summer Youth Olympics =

- IOC code: ARG
- NOC: Argentine Olympic Committee
- Website: www.coarg.org.ar (in Spanish)

in Singapore
- Competitors: 59 in 18 sports
- Flag bearer: Braian Toledo
- Medals Ranked 37th: Gold 1 Silver 2 Bronze 2 Total 5

Summer Youth Olympics appearances (overview)
- 2010; 2014; 2018; 2026

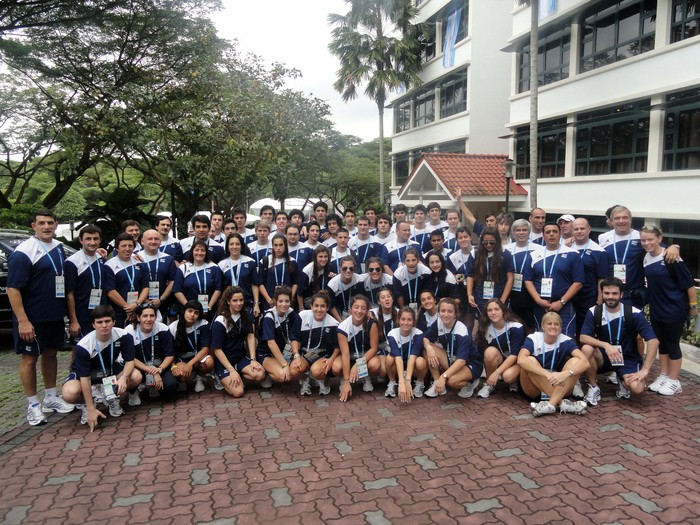
The Argentine delegation of the 2010 Summer Youth Olympics

Argentina participated at the 2010 Summer Youth Olympics in Singapore and competed with 59 athletes in 18 sports.

== Medalists ==
Medal	Name	Sport	Event	Date
Gold	Braian Toledo	Athletics	Javelin throw	22 Aug
Silver	Argentina Girls' Field Hockey team: Agustina Albertario; Agustina Álvarez; María Baldoni; Antonieta Bianchi; Rocío Broccoli; Antonella Brondello; Camila Bustos; Victoria Cabut; Julia Castignioli; Jimena Cedrés; Carla de Iure; Rocío Emme; Sol Fernandez; Eugenia Garraffo; Florencia Habif; Agustina Mama	Field hockey	Girls' tournament	24 Aug
Silver	Argentina Boys' Volleyball team: Gonzalo Lapera; Mauro Llanos; Nicolás Méndez; Ramiro Núñez; Gonzalo Quiroga; Tomás Ruíz; Federico Martina; Esteban Martínez; Ezequiel Palacios; Leonardo Plaza; Luciano Verasio; Damián Villalba	Volleyball	Boys' tournament	26 Aug
Bronze	Lucas Guzmán	Taekwondo	Men's 48 kg	15 Aug
Bronze	Fabián Maidana	Boxing	Men's light welter 64kg	24 Aug
Bronze	Lautaro Díaz	Triathlon	Mixed relay	19 Aug

== Athletics ==
=== Boys ===
Track and road events

Athletes	Event	Qualification		Final	
Athletes	Event	Result	Rank	Result	Rank
Federico Bruno	Boys' 3000m	8:52.78	16 qB	8:58.63	16

Field events

Athletes	Event	Qualification		Final	
Athletes	Event	Result	Rank	Result	Rank
Leandro Monje Cerino	Boys' long jump	6.81	13 qB	DNS	
Braian Toledo	Boys' javelin	77.27	1 Q	81.78	Gold medal

=== Girls ===
Track and road events

Athletes	Event	Qualification		Final	
Athletes	Event	Result	Rank	Result	Rank
Belén Casetta	Girls' 400m hurdles	1:04.58	12 qB	1:04.34	13

Field events

Athletes	Event	Qualification		Final	
Athletes	Event	Result	Rank	Result	Rank
Betsabé Páez	Girls' high jump	1.76	1 Q	1.79	6

== Basketball ==
Boys

Squad list	Event	Group stage		Placement stage			Rank
Squad list	Event	Group B	Rank	1st-8th	5th-8th	7th-8th	Rank
Carlos Benítez Gavilán; Martín Massone (C); Juan Rossi; Tomás Zanzottera	Boys' basketball	Panama; W 27-16	1	Greece; L 24-25	Israel; L 22-33	Spain; W 23-13	7
Carlos Benítez Gavilán; Martín Massone (C); Juan Rossi; Tomás Zanzottera	Boys' basketball	Iran; W 24-21	1	Greece; L 24-25	Israel; L 22-33	Spain; W 23-13	7
Carlos Benítez Gavilán; Martín Massone (C); Juan Rossi; Tomás Zanzottera	Boys' basketball	Egypt; W 30-24	1	Greece; L 24-25	Israel; L 22-33	Spain; W 23-13	7
Carlos Benítez Gavilán; Martín Massone (C); Juan Rossi; Tomás Zanzottera	Boys' basketball	Lithuania; W 31-27	1	Greece; L 24-25	Israel; L 22-33	Spain; W 23-13	7

Group stage

16 August

Argentina	27–16	Panama

17 August

Iran	21–24	Argentina

18 August

Argentina	30–24	Egypt

19 August

Lithuania	27–31	Argentina

Quarterfinals

21 August

Argentina	24–25	Greece

5th-8th place

22 August

Argentina	22–33	Israel

7th-8th place

23 August

Argentina	23–13	Spain

== Boxing ==
Athlete	Event	Preliminaries	Semifinals	3rd-place bout	Rank
Fabián Maidana	Light welter (64 kg)	Muhammad Oryakhil (AFG); W 13-2	Samuel Zapata (VEN); L 2-4	Oleg Nekliudov (UKR); W w/o	Bronze medal

== Canoeing ==
Girls

Athlete	Event	Time Trial		Round 1	Round 2 (Rep)	Round 3	Round 4	Round 5	Final
Athlete	Event	Time	Rank	Round 1	Round 2 (Rep)	Round 3	Round 4	Round 5	Final
Valentina Barrera	Girls' K1 slalom	2:08.59	22	Wolffhardt (AUT); L 2:07.59-1:37.12	Villumsen (DEN); L 2:04.45-1:53.86	Did not advance			
Valentina Barrera	Girls' K1 sprint	1:58.04	16	Bruska (POL); L 1:59.02-1:43.12	Novak (SLO); L 1:57.94-1:51.34	Did not advance			

== Cycling ==
Cross country

Athlete	Event	Time	Rank	Points
Kevin Ingratta	Boys' cross country	1:05:08	18	72
Verena Brunner	Girls' cross country	DNF		50

Time Trial

Athlete	Event	Time	Rank	Points
Facundo Lezica	Boys' time trial	4:12.27	13	26
Verena Brunner	Girls' time trial	3:38.55	14	37

BMX

Athlete	Event	Seeding round		Quarterfinals							Semifinals							Final		
Athlete	Event	Seeding round		Run 1		Run 2		Run 3		Rank	Run 1		Run 2		Run 3		Rank	Final		
Athlete	Event	Time	Rank	Time	Rank	Time	Rank	Time	Rank	Rank	Time	Rank	Time	Rank	Time	Rank	Rank	Time	Rank	Points
Lucas Bustos	Boys' BMX	31.857	5	32.103	1	32.344	1	32.794	2	1 Q	33.105	5	31.812	2	31.843	2	2 Q	31.868	4	25
Verena Brunner	Girls' BMX	48.200	19	45.417	5	45.708	5	46.739	5	5	Did not advance									40

Road race

Athlete	Event	Time	Rank	Points
Facundo Lezica	Boys' road race	1:05:44	49	72
Kevin Ingratta	Boys' road race	DNF		
Lucas Bustos	Boys' road race	DNF		

Overall

team	Event	Cross country pts		Time trial pts		BMX pts		Road race pts	Total	Rank
team	Event	Boys	Girls	Boys	Girls	Boys	Girls	Road race pts	Total	Rank
Verena Brunner; Kevin Ingratta; Facundo Lezica; Lucas Bustos	Mixed team	72	50	26	37	25	40	72	322	21

== Equestrian ==
Athlete	Horse	Event	Round 1			Round 2			Total	Jump-off		Rank
Athlete	Horse	Event	Penalties		Rank	Penalties		Rank	Total	Penalties	Time	Rank
Athlete	Horse	Event	Jump	Time	Rank	Jump	Time	Rank	Total	Penalties	Time	Rank
María Victoria Paz	Glen Haven Accolade	Individual jumping	Eliminated									
María Victoria Paz (ARG); Guilherme Foroni (BRA); Alberto Schwalm (CHI); Mario Gamboa (COL); Marcelo Chirico (URU)	The Hec Man; Glen Haven Accolade; Stoneleigh Eddie; LH Titan; Links Hot Gossip	Team jumping	~~16~~; ~~12~~; 8; 4; 0	~~0~~; ~~0~~; 0; 0; 0	4	0; ~~16~~; ~~16~~; 0; 4	0; ~~0~~; ~~0~~; 0; 0	2	16			5

== Fencing ==
Group stage

Athlete	Event	Match 1	Match 2	Match 3	Match 4	Match 5	Match 6	Seed
Clara Isabel Di Tella	Girls' épée	Matshaya (RSA); W 5-3	Tătăran (ROU); L 1-5	Bakhareva (RUS); L 3-5	Lee (KOR); L 2-5	Radford (GBR); L 2-3		10

Knock-out stage

Athlete	Event	Round of 16	Quarterfinals	Semifinals	Final	Rank
Clara Isabel Di Tella	Girls' épée	Santuccio (ITA); L 7-15	Did not advance			10
Americas 2 Maria Carreno (VEN); Guilherme Melaragno (BRA); Mona Shaito (USA); Miguel Breault-Mallette (CAN); Clara Isabel Di Tella (ARG); Redys Prades Rosabal (CUB)	Mixed team	Africa; W 28-25	Europe 1 L 17-30	5th-8th Europe 3 L 23-30	7th-8th Asia-Oceania 2 W 28-27	7

== Gymnastics ==
=== Artistic gymnastics ===
Girls

Athlete	Event	Vault		Uneven bars		Beam		Floor		Total	
Athlete	Event	Score	Rank	Score	Rank	Score	Rank	Score	Rank	Score	Rank
Agustina Estarli	Girls' qualification	12.500	34	10.350	35	9.750	40	11.500	34	44.100	36

=== Trampoline ===
Athlete	Event	Qualification				Final	
Athlete	Event	Routine 1	Routine 2	Total	Rank	Routine 1	Rank
Lucas Adorno	Boys' trampoline	23.300	33.800	57.100	9	Did not advance	

== Field hockey ==
Squad list	Event	Group stage		Final	
Squad list	Event	Opposition Score	Rank	Opposition Score	Rank
Antonella Brondello; Victoria Cabut; Rocío Emme; Rocío Broccoli; Julia Castiglioni; Carla de Iure; Agustina Albertario; Antonieta Bianchi; Eugenia Garrafo; Jimena Cedrés; Sol Fernández; María Baldoni; Florencia Habif; Camila Bustos (C); Agustina Álvarez; Agustina Mama	Girls' Field hockey	South Africa; W 7-0	1	Netherlands; L 1-2	Silver medal
Antonella Brondello; Victoria Cabut; Rocío Emme; Rocío Broccoli; Julia Castiglioni; Carla de Iure; Agustina Albertario; Antonieta Bianchi; Eugenia Garrafo; Jimena Cedrés; Sol Fernández; María Baldoni; Florencia Habif; Camila Bustos (C); Agustina Álvarez; Agustina Mama	Girls' Field hockey	South Korea; W 4-1	1	Netherlands; L 1-2	Silver medal
Antonella Brondello; Victoria Cabut; Rocío Emme; Rocío Broccoli; Julia Castiglioni; Carla de Iure; Agustina Albertario; Antonieta Bianchi; Eugenia Garrafo; Jimena Cedrés; Sol Fernández; María Baldoni; Florencia Habif; Camila Bustos (C); Agustina Álvarez; Agustina Mama	Girls' Field hockey	(Republic of Ireland) Ireland; W 3-0	1	Netherlands; L 1-2	Silver medal
Antonella Brondello; Victoria Cabut; Rocío Emme; Rocío Broccoli; Julia Castiglioni; Carla de Iure; Agustina Albertario; Antonieta Bianchi; Eugenia Garrafo; Jimena Cedrés; Sol Fernández; María Baldoni; Florencia Habif; Camila Bustos (C); Agustina Álvarez; Agustina Mama	Girls' Field hockey	Netherlands; T 2-2	1	Netherlands; L 1-2	Silver medal
Antonella Brondello; Victoria Cabut; Rocío Emme; Rocío Broccoli; Julia Castiglioni; Carla de Iure; Agustina Albertario; Antonieta Bianchi; Eugenia Garrafo; Jimena Cedrés; Sol Fernández; María Baldoni; Florencia Habif; Camila Bustos (C); Agustina Álvarez; Agustina Mama	Girls' Field hockey	New Zealand; W 1-0	1	Netherlands; L 1-2	Silver medal

Group stage

16 August 2010
18:00

Argentina	7 – 0	South Africa
Alvarez 18'; Garrafo 23' 64'; Bustos 31' 46'; Albertario 34'; Fernandez 39'	Report

Umpires:
Chen Hong (CHN)
Miskarmalia Mohd Ariffin (SIN)

17 August 2010
20:00

South Korea	1 – 4	Argentina
Baek Ee-Seul 52'	Report	Albertario 29'; Habif 35'; Fernandez 49'; Alvarez 61'

Umpires:
Hannah Sanders (GBR)
Celine Martin-Schmets (BEL)

19 August 2010
18:00

Ireland	0 – 3	Argentina
		Alvarez 25'; Broccoli 44'; Eugenia Garrafo 70'

Umpires:
Angela Street (AUS)
Celine Martin-Schmets (BEL)

20 August 2010
20:00

Argentina	2 – 2	Netherlands
Garrafo 1'; Alvarez 55'		Dell'Anna 57'; Broek 70'

Umpires:
Angela Street (AUS)
Chen Hong (CHN)

22 August 2010
16:00

New Zealand	0 – 1	Argentina
		Broccoli 61'

Umpires:
Angela Street (AUS)
Hannah Sanders (GBR)

Gold-medal match

24 August 2010
20:00

Argentina	1 – 2 (OT)	Netherlands
Albertario 24'		van Wijk 47' 78'

Umpires:
Angela Street (GBR)
Maritza Perez Castro (URU)

== Judo ==
Individual

Athlete	Event	Round 1	Round 2	Round 3	Semifinals	Final	Rank
Athlete	Event	Opposition Result	Opposition Result	Opposition Result	Opposition Result	Opposition Result	Rank
Bruno Abel Villalba	Boys' -100 kg	Pineda (VEN); L 000-021	Repechage; Mamistvalov (ISR); L 000-100	Did not advance			9

Team

team	Event	Round 1	Round 2	Semifinals	Final	Rank
team	Event	Opposition Result	Opposition Result	Opposition Result	Opposition Result	Rank
Osaka; Bruno Abel Villalba (ARG); Sothea Sam (CAM); Abdulrahman Anter (YEM); Jing Fang Tang (SIN); Brandon Arends (ARU); Laura Naginskaitė (LTU); Alexios Ntanatsidis (GRE); Natalia Kubin (GER)	Mixed team	Barcelona; W 5-3	Belgrade; L 4-4 (1-3)	Did not advance		5

== Rowing ==
Athlete(s)	Event	Heats		Repechage		Semifinals		Final	
Athlete(s)	Event	Time	Rank	Time	Rank	Time	Rank	Time	Rank
Facundo Torres	Boys' single sculls	3:27.20	3 QR	3:51.49	4 QC/D	DNS		Did not advance	

== Sailing ==
Boys

Athlete	Event	Race																	Net points	Final rank
Athlete	Event	1	2	3	4	5	6	7	8	9	10	11	12	13	14	15	16	M*	Net points	Final rank
Bautista Saubidet Birkner	Boys' Techno 293	10	8	7	~~16~~	5	7	5	4	6	9	Cancelled						6	67	7
Juan Ignacio Biava	Boys' Byte CII	14	20	~~23~~	18	20	18	~~27~~	17	10	1	9	Cancelled					19	146	21

Girls

Athlete	Event	Race																	Net points	Final rank
Athlete	Event	1	2	3	4	5	6	7	8	9	10	11	12	13	14	15	16	M*	Net points	Final rank
Valentina Serigos	Girls' Techno 293	5	~~6~~	3	3	5	6	5	3	5	3	Cancelled						9	47	6

== Swimming ==
Athlete	Events	Heat		Semifinal		Final	
Athlete	Events	Time	Rank	Time	Rank	Time	Rank
Roberto Strelkov	Boys' 50 m freestyle	23.90	15	23.68	13	Did not advance	
Roberto Strelkov	Boys' 100 m freestyle	52.15	20	Did not advance			
Roberto Strelkov	Boys' 100 m butterfly	55.15	12	55.20	16	Did not advance	
Mijal Asis	Girls' 100 metre breaststroke	1:14.54	23	Did not advance			
Mijal Asis	Girls' 200 metre breaststroke	2:41.59	15	Did not advance			

== Table tennis ==
Individual

Athlete	Event	Round 1		Round 2		Quarterfinals	Semifinals	Final	Rank
Athlete	Event	Group F	Rank	Group GG	Rank	Quarterfinals	Semifinals	Final	Rank
Pablo Saragovi	Boys' singles	Kim (KOR); L 0-3 (3-11, 8-11, 6-11)	4 qB	Jouti (BRA); L 0-3 (4-11, 7-11, 6-11)	4	Did not advance			29
Pablo Saragovi	Boys' singles	Wu (NZL); L 1-3 (11-9, 10-12, 15-17, 6-11)	4 qB	Tapia (ECU); L 1-3 (11-3, 8-11, 6-11, 8-11)	4	Did not advance			29
Pablo Saragovi	Boys' singles	Onaolapo (NGR); L 1-3 (11-5, 7-11, 4-11, 2-11)	4 qB	Hmam (TUN); W 3-1 (11-1, 5-11, 11-8, 11-7)	4	Did not advance			29

Team

Athlete	Event	Round 1		Round 2	Quarterfinals	Semifinals	Final	Rank
Athlete	Event	Group matches	Rank	Round 2	Quarterfinals	Semifinals	Final	Rank
Pan America 2 Pablo Saragovi (ARG); Carelyn Cordero (PUR)	Mixed team	Chinese Taipei; Huang (TPE); Hung (TPE); L 0-3 (0-3, 0-3, 0-3)	3 qB	BYE	Europe 3 Loveridge (GBR); Mutti (ITA); L 1-2 (3-2, 2-3, 1-3)	Did not advance		21
Pan America 2 Pablo Saragovi (ARG); Carelyn Cordero (PUR)	Mixed team	New Zealand; Wu (NZL); Wu (NZL); W 3-0 (3-0, 3-1, 3-1)	3 qB	BYE	Europe 3 Loveridge (GBR); Mutti (ITA); L 1-2 (3-2, 2-3, 1-3)	Did not advance		21
Pan America 2 Pablo Saragovi (ARG); Carelyn Cordero (PUR)	Mixed team	Croatia; Jeger (CRO); Fucec (CRO); L 0-3 (0-3, 1-3, 0-3)	3 qB	BYE	Europe 3 Loveridge (GBR); Mutti (ITA); L 1-2 (3-2, 2-3, 1-3)	Did not advance		21

== Taekwondo ==
Boys

Athlete	Event	Quarterfinal	Semifinal	Final	Rank
Lucas Guzmán	Boys' -48kg	W 2–1; Vittorio Rega (ITA)	L 5–4; Gili Haimovitz (ISR)	Did not advance	Bronze medal

== Tennis ==
Athlete	Event	Round of 32		Round of 16		Quarterfinals		Semifinals		Final	
Athlete	Event	Opposition	Score	Opposition	Score	Opposition	Score	Opposition	Score	Opposition	Score
Renzo Olivo	Boys' singles	Ricardo Rodriguez (VEN)	L 6-7;6-3	Jason Patrombon (PHI)	W/O	Did not advance					
Agustina Sol Eskenazi	Girls' singles	Jana Čepelová (SVK)	L 6-1;3-1 (RET)	Katarena Paliivets (CAN)	W/O	Did not advance					
Renzo Olivo (ARG); Tiago Fernandes (BRA)	Boys' doubles			Peter Heller (GER); Kevin Krawietz (GER)	W 6-3;7-5	Diego Galeano (PAR); Ricardo Rodriguez (VEN)	L 4-6;4-6	Did not advance			
Agustina Sol Eskenazi (ARG); Verónica Cepede Royg (PAR)	Girls' Doubles			Sofiya Kovalets (UKR); Elina Svitolina (UKR)	L 2-6;6-4;5-10	Did not advance					

== Triathlon ==
Men's

Athlete	Event	Swim (1.5 km)	Trans 1	Bike (40 km)	Trans 2	Run (10 km)	Total	Rank
Lautaro Díaz	individual	8:40	0:33	28:38	0:25	18:38	56:54.91	10

Mixed

Athlete	Event	Total times per athlete (Swim 250 m, Bike 7 km, Run 1.7 km)	Total group time	Rank
Lautaro Díaz (ARG); Kelly Whitley (USA); Kevin McDowell (USA); Adriana Barraza (MEX)	Mixed team Relay; Americas 1	20:22; 18:29; 21:44; 19:23	1:19:58.88	Bronze medal

== Volleyball ==
Squad list	Event	Group stage		Semifinal	Final	Rank
Squad list	Event	Group B	Rank	Semifinal	Final	Rank
Mauro Llanos; Luciano Verasio; Leonardo Plaza; Federico Martina; Gonzalo Lapera; Ramiro Núñez; Esteban Martínez; Gonzalo Quiroga (C); Tomás Ruíz; Ezequiel Palacios; Nicolás Méndez; Damián Villalba	Boys' Volleyball	Iran; W 3-0 (25-12, 25-9, 29-27)	2 Q	Russia; W 3-0 (25-10, 25-16, 25-19)	Cuba; L 1-3 (23-25, 21-25, 25-17, 20-25)	Silver medal
Mauro Llanos; Luciano Verasio; Leonardo Plaza; Federico Martina; Gonzalo Lapera; Ramiro Núñez; Esteban Martínez; Gonzalo Quiroga (C); Tomás Ruíz; Ezequiel Palacios; Nicolás Méndez; Damián Villalba	Boys' Volleyball	Cuba; L 0-3 (22-25, 23-25, 23-25)	2 Q	Russia; W 3-0 (25-10, 25-16, 25-19)	Cuba; L 1-3 (23-25, 21-25, 25-17, 20-25)	Silver medal

Group stage

Date		Score		Set 1	Set 2	Set 3	Set 4	Set 5	Total
21 Aug	Argentina	3–0	Iran	25–12	25–9	29–27			79–48
22 Aug	Argentina	0-3	Cuba	22-25	23-25	23-25			68-75

Semi-finals

Date		Score		Set 1	Set 2	Set 3	Set 4	Set 5	Total
24 Aug	Russia	0-3	Argentina	10-25	16-25	19-25			45-75

Gold-medal match

Date		Score		Set 1	Set 2	Set 3	Set 4	Set 5	Total
26 Aug	Argentina	1-3	Cuba	23-25	21-25	25-17	20-25		89-92

== Day-by-day ==
15 August

- Rowing – Boys' single sculls heats (Facundo Torres)
- Taekwondo – Boys' quarterfinal; Lucas Guzman against Vittorio Rega (Argentina) vs. (Italy)
- Taekwondo – Boys' semifinal; Lucas Guzman against Gili Haimovitz (Argentina) vs. (Israel)
- Tennis – Girls' singles round of 32; Agustina Sol Eskenazi against Jana Čepelová (Argentina) vs. (Slovakia)

16 August

- Basketball – Boys' team group stage (Argentina) vs. (Panama)
- Hockey – Girls' team group stage (Argentina) vs. (South Africa)
- Rowing – Boys' single sculls repechage (Facundo Torres)
- Swimming – Boys' 100 metre butterfly heats (Roberto Strelkov)
- Swimming – Boys' 100 metre butterfly semifinal (Roberto Strelkov)
- Tennis – Boys' singles round of 32; Renzo Olivo against Ricardo Rodriguez (Argentina) vs. (Venezuela)
- Tennis – Boys' doubles round of 16; Renzo Olivo and Tiago Fernandes against Peter Heller and Kevin Krawietz (Argentina) / (Brazil) vs (Germany) / (Germany)
- Triathlon – Boys' individual race final (Lautaro Diaz)

17 August

- Athletics – Boys' 3000 metre qualification (Federico Bruno)
- Cycling – Girls' cross country final (Verena Brunner)
- Cycling – Boys' cross country final (Kevin Ingratta)
- Cycling – Boys' time trial final (Facundo Lezica)
- Basketball – Boys' team group stage (Argentina) vs. (Iran)
- Fencing – Girls' individual épée pool round; Clara Isabel Di Tella against Amy Radford (Argentina) vs. (United Kingdom)
- Fencing – Girls' individual épée pool round; Clara Isabel Di Tella against Hye Won Lee (Argentina) vs. (South Korea)
- Fencing – Girls' individual épée pool round; Clara Isabel Di Tella against Wanda Matshaya (Argentina) vs. (South Africa)
- Fencing – Girls' individual épée pool round; Clara Isabel Di Tella against Yulia Bakhareva (Argentina) vs. (Russia)
- Fencing – Girls' individual épée pool round; Clara Isabel Di Tella against Amalia Tataran (Argentina) vs. (Romania)
- Fencing – Girls' individual épée round of 16; Clara Isabel Di Tella against Alberta Santuccio (Argentina) vs. (Italy)
- Gymnastics (artistic) – Girls' qualification (Agustina Estarli)
- Hockey – Girls' team group stage (Argentina) vs. (South Korea)
- Sailing – Boys' windsurfing Techno 293 (Bautista Saubidet Birkner) Race 1
- Sailing – Boys' windsurfing Techno 293 (Bautista Saubidet Birkner) Race 2
- Sailing – Boys' one-person dinghy Byte CII (Juan Ignacio Biava) Race 1
- Sailing – Boys' one-person dinghy Byte CII (Juan Ignacio Biava) Race 2
- Sailing – Girls' windsurfing Techno 293 (Valentina Serigos) Race 1
- Sailing – Girls' windsurfing Techno 293 (Valentina Serigos) Race 2
- Swimming – Boys' 50 metre freestyle heats (Roberto Strelkov)
- Swimming – Boys' 50 metre freestyle semifinal (Roberto Strelkov)
- Swimming – Girls' 100 metre breaststroke heats (Mijal Asis)
- Tennis – Boys' singles consolidation first round; Renzo Olivo against Jason Patrombon (Argentina) vs. (Philippines)
- Tennis – Boys' doubles quarterfinals; Renzo Olivo and Tiago Fernandes against Diego Galeano and Ricardo Rodriguez (Argentina) / (Brazil) vs (Paraguay) / (Venezuela)

18 August

- Athletics – Boys' long jump qualification (Leandro Monje Cerino)
- Athletics – Girls' high jump qualification (Betsabe Paez)
- Athletics – Boys' Javelin Qualification (Braian Toledo)
- Basketball – Boys' team group stage (Argentina) vs. (Egypt)
- Equestrian – Team's jumping round 1 (Maria Victoria Paz)
- Sailing – Boys' windsurfing Techno 293 (Bautista Saubidet Birkner) Race 3
- Sailing – Boys' windsurfing Techno 293 (Bautista Saubidet Birkner) Race 4
- Sailing – Boys' one-person dinghy Byte CII (Juan Ignacio Biava) Race 3
- Sailing – Boys' one-person dinghy Byte CII (Juan Ignacio Biava) Race 4
- Sailing – Girls' windsurfing Techno 293 (Valentina Serigos) Race 3
- Sailing – Girls' windsurfing Techno 293 (Valentina Serigos) Race 4

19 August

- Athletics – Girls' 400 metre H qualification heats (Belen Casetta)
- Cycling – Boys' BMX seeding phase (Lucas Bustos)
- Basketball – Boys' team group stage (Argentina) vs. (Lithuania)
- Hockey – Girls' team group stage (Argentina) vs. (Republic of Ireland)
- Swimming – Boys' 100 metre freestyle heats (Roberto Strelkov)
- Triathlon – Mixed race final (Lautaro Diaz)

20 August

- Equestrian – Team's jumping round 2 final (Maria Victoria Paz)
- Gymnastics (trampoline) – Boys' first routine (Lucas Adorno)
- Gymnastics (trampoline) – Boys' second routine (Lucas Adorno)
- Hockey – Girls' team group stage (Argentina) vs. (Netherlands)
- Sailing – Boys' windsurfing Techno 293 (Bautista Saubidet Birkner) Race 5
- Sailing – Boys' windsurfing Techno 293 (Bautista Saubidet Birkner) Race 6
- Sailing – Boys' windsurfing Techno 293 (Bautista Saubidet Birkner) Race 7
- Sailing – Boys' one-person dinghy Byte CII (Juan Ignacio Biava) Race 5
- Sailing – Boys' one-person dinghy Byte CII (Juan Ignacio Biava) Race 6
- Sailing – Boys' one-person dinghy Byte CII (Juan Ignacio Biava) Race 7
- Sailing – Girls' windsurfing Techno 293 (Valentina Serigos) Race 5
- Sailing – Girls' windsurfing Techno 293 (Valentina Serigos) Race 6
- Sailing – Girls' windsurfing Techno 293 (Valentina Serigos) Race 7
- Swimming – Girls' 200 metre breaststroke heats (Mijal Asis)

21 August

- Basketball – Boys' team quarterfinals (Argentina) vs. (Greece)
- Canoeing – Girls' head-to-head canoe sprint K-1 time trial (Valentina Barrera)
- Sailing – Boys' windsurfing Techno 293 (Bautista Saubidet Birkner) Race 8
- Sailing – Boys' windsurfing Techno 293 (Bautista Saubidet Birkner) Race 9
- Sailing – Boys' windsurfing Techno 293 (Bautista Saubidet Birkner) Race 10
- Sailing – Boys' one-person dinghy Byte CII (Juan Ignacio Biava) Race 8
- Sailing – Boys' one-person dinghy Byte CII (Juan Ignacio Biava) Race 9
- Sailing – Boys' one-person dinghy Byte CII (Juan Ignacio Biava) Race 10
- Sailing – Girls' windsurfing Techno 293 (Valentina Serigos) Race 8
- Sailing – Girls' windsurfing Techno 293 (Valentina Serigos) Race 9
- Sailing – Girls' windsurfing Techno 293 (Valentina Serigos) Race 10
- Volleyball – Boys' team group stage (Argentina) vs. (Iran)

22 August

- Athletics – Boys' 3000 metre final B (Federico Bruno)
- Athletics – Boys' long jump final B (Leandro Monje Cerino)
- Athletics – Boys' javelin final (Braian Toledo)
- Athletics – Girls' high jump final (Betsabe Paez)
- Basketball – Boys' team 5th–8th place (Argentina) vs. (Israel)
- Equestrian – Jumping individual round A (Maria Victoria Paz)
- Hockey – Girls' team group stage (Argentina) vs. (New Zealand)
- Volleyball – Boys' team group stage (Argentina) vs. (Cuba)

23 August

- Athletics – Girls' 400 metre H Final B (Belen Casetta)
- Judo – Boys' -100 kg round of 32
- Sailing – Boys' windsurfing Techno 293 (Bautista Saubidet Birkner) Race 11
- Sailing – Boys' windsurfing Techno 293 (Bautista Saubidet Birkner) Race 12
- Sailing – Boys' one-person dinghy Byte CII (Juan Ignacio Biava) Race 11
- Sailing – Boys' one-person dinghy Byte CII (Juan Ignacio Biava) Race 12
- Sailing – Girls' windsurfing Techno 293 (Valentina Serigos) Race 11
- Sailing – Girls' windsurfing Techno 293 (Valentina Serigos) Race 12

24 August

- Equestrian – Jumping individual round B final (Maria Victoria Paz)
- Canoeing – Girls' K-1 obstacle canoe slalom time trial (Valentina Barrera)
- Sailing – Boys' windsurfing Techno 293 (Bautista Saubidet Birkner) Race 13
- Sailing – Boys' windsurfing Techno 293 (Bautista Saubidet Birkner) Race 14
- Sailing – Boys' windsurfing Techno 293 (Bautista Saubidet Birkner) Race 15
- Sailing – Boys' one-person dinghy Byte CII (Juan Ignacio Biava) Race 13
- Sailing – Boys' one-person dinghy Byte CII (Juan Ignacio Biava) Race 14
- Sailing – Boys' one-person dinghy Byte CII (Juan Ignacio Biava) Race 15
- Sailing – Girls' windsurfing Techno 293 (Valentina Serigos) Race 13
- Sailing – Girls' windsurfing Techno 293 (Valentina Serigos) Race 14
- Sailing – Girls' windsurfing Techno 293 (Valentina Serigos) Race 15

25 August

- Equestrian – Jumping individual final (Maria Victoria Paz)
- Sailing – Boys' windsurfing Techno 293 (Bautista Saubidet Birkner) Race 16 final
- Sailing – Boys' one-person dinghy Byte CII (Juan Ignacio Biava) Race 16 final
- Sailing – Girls' windsurfing Techno 293 (Valentina Serigos) Race 16 final
