= New Zealand at the 2010 Summer Youth Olympics =

- IOC code: NZL
- NOC: New Zealand Olympic Committee
- Website: www.olympic.org.nz

in Singapore
- Competitors: 54 in 16 sports
- Flag bearer: Jackson Gill
- Medals Ranked 38th: Gold 1 Silver 2 Bronze 1 Total 4

Summer Youth Olympics appearances
- 2010; 2014; 2018; 2026

New Zealand participated in the 2010 Summer Youth Olympics in Singapore.

The New Zealand squad consisted of 54 athletes competing in 16 sports: aquatics (swimming), athletics, badminton, basketball, boxing, cycling, equestrian, field hockey, judo, rowing, sailing, shooting, table tennis, triathlon, weightlifting and wrestling.

== Medalists ==
Medal	Name	Sport	Event	Date
Gold	Aaron Barclay	Triathlon	Boy's Triathlon	16 Aug
Silver	Aaron Barclay; Maddie Dillon	Triathlon	Mixed Relay	19 Aug
Silver	Jake Lambert	Equestrian	Team Jumping	20 Aug
Silver	Jackson Gill	Athletics	Boys' Shot put	22 Aug
Silver	Joseph Parker	Boxing	Men's Super Heavy +91kg	25 Aug
Silver	Haley Baxter	Judo	Mixed Team	25 Aug
Bronze	New Zealand Girls' Field Hockey team: Georgia Barnett; Amy Barry; Jamie Bolton; Jessica Chisholm; Michaela Curtis; Samara Dalziel; Rhiannon Dennison; Erin Goad; Elizabeth Rose Keddell; Sarah Matthews; Rachel McCann; Kate McCaw; Elley Miller; Danielle Sutherland; Lydia Velzian; Kayla Wilson	Field hockey	Girls' tournament	24 Aug

== Athletics ==
Note: The athletes who do not have a "Q" next to their Qualification Rank advance to a non-medal ranking final.

=== Boys ===
Track and road events

Athletes	Event	Qualification		Final	
Athletes	Event	Result	Rank	Result	Rank
Yarride Rosario	Boys' 100m	11.46	20 qC	11.73	21
Brad Mathas	Boys' 1000m	2:44.64	20 qB	2:34.47	18
Mohamed Ali	Boys' 3000m	9:07.60	18 qB	9:01.30	17
Joshua Hawkins	Boys' 110m Hurdles	14.46	12 qB	14.59	12
Matthew Holcroft	Boys' 10km Walk			DNF	

Field events

Athletes	Event	Qualification		Final	
Athletes	Event	Result	Rank	Result	Rank
Jackson Gill	Boys' Shot put	21.73	2 Q	22.60	Silver medal

=== Girls ===
Track and road events

Athletes	Event	Qualification		Final	
Athletes	Event	Result	Rank	Result	Rank
Hazel Bowering-Scott	Girls' 200m	25.33	13 qB	25.35	13
Anna-Lisa Uttley	Girls' 3000m	10:07.69	11 qB	10:07.63	12
Jenna Hansen	Girls' 2000m Steeplechase	8:11.91	15 qB	8:03.65	14
Michelle Jenneke (AUS); Monica Brennan (AUS); Hazel Bowering-Scott (NZL); Jenny Blundell (AUS)	Girls' medley relay			2:13.96	4

Field events

Athletes	Event	Qualification		Final	
Athletes	Event	Result	Rank	Result	Rank
Julia Ratcliffe	Girls' Hammer throw	50.41	11 qB	50.49	11

== Badminton ==
Boys

Athlete	Event	Group Stage				Knock-Out Stage			
Athlete	Event	Match 1	Match 2	Match 3	Rank	Quarterfinal	Semifinal	Final	Rank
Asher Richardson	Boys' Singles	Cuba (PER) L 0-2 (13-21, 18-21)	Bhamidipati (IND) L 0-2 (12-21, 12-21)	Huang (SIN) L 0-2 (7-21, 8-21)	4	Did not advance			

Girls

Athlete	Event	Group Stage				Knock-Out Stage			
Athlete	Event	Match 1	Match 2	Match 3	Rank	Quarterfinal	Semifinal	Final	Rank
Victoria Cheng	Girls' Singles	Suwarno (INA) L 0-2 (15-21, 5-21)	Deng (CHN) L 0-2 (9-21, 5-21)	Winder (PER) L 1-2 (16-21, 21-19, 10-21)	4	Did not advance			

== Basketball ==
Boys

Squad List	Event	Group Stage		Placement Stage			Rank
Squad List	Event	Group A	Rank	9th-16th	13th-16th	13th-14th	Rank
Michael Karena; Reuben Te Rangi; James Ashby (C); Ben Fraser	Boys' Basketball	Greece; L 19-22	3	Iran; L 17-29	Central African Republic; W 29-21	Egypt; L 26-29	14
Michael Karena; Reuben Te Rangi; James Ashby (C); Ben Fraser	Boys' Basketball	Puerto Rico; W 30-26	3	Iran; L 17-29	Central African Republic; W 29-21	Egypt; L 26-29	14
Michael Karena; Reuben Te Rangi; James Ashby (C); Ben Fraser	Boys' Basketball	Serbia; L 13-30	3	Iran; L 17-29	Central African Republic; W 29-21	Egypt; L 26-29	14
Michael Karena; Reuben Te Rangi; James Ashby (C); Ben Fraser	Boys' Basketball	India; W 17-12	3	Iran; L 17-29	Central African Republic; W 29-21	Egypt; L 26-29	14

== Boxing ==
Boys

Athlete	Event	Preliminaries	Semifinals	Final	Rank
Joseph Parker	Super Heavyweight (+91kg)		Jozsef Zsigmond (HUN); W RET R2 0:37	Tony Yoka (FRA); L 5-8	Silver medal

== Cycling ==
Cross Country

Athlete	Event	Time	Rank	Points
Sam Shaw	Boys’ Cross Country	1:08:28	23	72
Sarah Kate McDonald	Girls’ Cross Country	55:30	14	37

Time Trial

Athlete	Event	Time	Rank	Points
Denay Cottam	Boys’ Time Trial	4:12.12	12	25
Sarah Kate McDonald	Girls’ Time Trial	3:28.24	4	12

BMX

Athlete	Event	Seeding Round		Quarterfinals							Semifinals							Final		
Athlete	Event	Seeding Round		Run 1		Run 2		Run 3		Rank	Run 1		Run 2		Run 3		Rank	Final		
Athlete	Event	Time	Rank	Time	Rank	Time	Rank	Time	Rank	Rank	Time	Rank	Time	Rank	Time	Rank	Rank	Time	Rank	Points
Trent Woodcock	Boys’ BMX	32.181	6	32.394	2	32.394	2	32.792	2	2 Q	32.133	3	42.466	6	DNF	7	6	Did not advance		58
Sarah Kate McDonald	Girls’ BMX	44.089	11	43.669	3	43.577	3	44.292	3	3 Q	43.567	5	44.083	6	44.908	7	6	Did not advance		32

Road Race

Athlete	Event	Time	Rank	Points
Denay Cottam	Boys’ Road Race	1:05:44	18	72
Sam Shaw	Boys’ Road Race	DNF		
Trent Woodcock	Boys’ Road Race	DNS		

Overall

Team	Event	Cross Country Pts		Time Trial Pts		BMX Pts		Road Race Pts	Total	Rank
Team	Event	Boys	Girls	Boys	Girls	Boys	Girls	Road Race Pts	Total	Rank
Sarah Kate McDonald; Sam Shaw; Denay Cottam; Trent Woodcock	Mixed Team	72	37	25	12	58	32	72	308	20

== Equestrian-Showjumping ==
Athlete	Horse	Event	Round 1			Round 2			Total	Jump-Off		Rank
Athlete	Horse	Event	Penalties		Rank	Penalties		Rank	Total	Penalties	Time	Rank
Athlete	Horse	Event	Jump	Time	Rank	Jump	Time	Rank	Total	Penalties	Time	Rank
Jake Lambert	Le Lucky	Individual Jumping	12	0	23	4	0	8	16			21
Jasmine Zin Man Lai (HKG); Jake Lambert (NZL); Xu Zhengyang (CHN); Sultan Al Tooqi (OMA); Thomas McDermott (AUS)	Butterfly Kisses; Le Lucky; Foxdale Villarni; Joondooree Farms Damiro; Hugo	Team Jumping	~~12~~; 0; ~~16~~; 4; 0	~~0~~; 0; ~~0~~; 0; 0	1	4; 0; ~~20~~; ~~4~~; 0	0; 0; ~~0~~; ~~0~~; 0	2	8	0; ~~12~~; 0; 4; ~~8~~	50.27; ~~46.13~~; 51.46; 52.23; ~~46.10~~	Silver medal

== Field hockey ==
Squad List	Event	Group Stage		Bronze Medal Match	
Squad List	Event	Opposition Score	Rank	Opposition Score	Rank
Georgia Barnett; Amy Barry; Jamie Bolton; Jessica Chisholm; Michaela Curtis; Samara Dalziel; Rhiannon Dennison; Erin Goad; Elizabeth Rose Keddell; Sarah Matthews; Rachel McCann (C); Kate McCaw; Elley Miller; Danielle Sutherland; Lydia Velzian; Kayla Wilson	Girls' Field hockey	South Korea; W 3-2	3	South Korea; W 5-4	Bronze medal
Georgia Barnett; Amy Barry; Jamie Bolton; Jessica Chisholm; Michaela Curtis; Samara Dalziel; Rhiannon Dennison; Erin Goad; Elizabeth Rose Keddell; Sarah Matthews; Rachel McCann (C); Kate McCaw; Elley Miller; Danielle Sutherland; Lydia Velzian; Kayla Wilson	Girls' Field hockey	(Republic of Ireland) Ireland; W 3-2	3	South Korea; W 5-4	Bronze medal
Georgia Barnett; Amy Barry; Jamie Bolton; Jessica Chisholm; Michaela Curtis; Samara Dalziel; Rhiannon Dennison; Erin Goad; Elizabeth Rose Keddell; Sarah Matthews; Rachel McCann (C); Kate McCaw; Elley Miller; Danielle Sutherland; Lydia Velzian; Kayla Wilson	Girls' Field hockey	Netherlands; L 0-1	3	South Korea; W 5-4	Bronze medal
Georgia Barnett; Amy Barry; Jamie Bolton; Jessica Chisholm; Michaela Curtis; Samara Dalziel; Rhiannon Dennison; Erin Goad; Elizabeth Rose Keddell; Sarah Matthews; Rachel McCann (C); Kate McCaw; Elley Miller; Danielle Sutherland; Lydia Velzian; Kayla Wilson	Girls' Field hockey	South Africa; W 4-0	3	South Korea; W 5-4	Bronze medal
Georgia Barnett; Amy Barry; Jamie Bolton; Jessica Chisholm; Michaela Curtis; Samara Dalziel; Rhiannon Dennison; Erin Goad; Elizabeth Rose Keddell; Sarah Matthews; Rachel McCann (C); Kate McCaw; Elley Miller; Danielle Sutherland; Lydia Velzian; Kayla Wilson	Girls' Field hockey	Argentina; L 0-1	3	South Korea; W 5-4	Bronze medal

== Judo ==
Individual

Athlete	Event	Round 1	Round 2	Round 3	Semifinals	Final	Rank
Athlete	Event	Opposition Result	Opposition Result	Opposition Result	Opposition Result	Opposition Result	Rank
Haley Baxter	Girls' -63 kg	BYE	Naginskaite (LTU); L 000-102	Repechage; Tchaniley-Larounga (TOG); W 100-000	Repechage; Chammas (LIB); L 000-100	Did not advance	13

Team

Team	Event	Round 1	Round 2	Semifinals	Final	Rank
Team	Event	Opposition Result	Opposition Result	Opposition Result	Opposition Result	Rank
Belgrade; Anna Dmitrieva (RUS); Jeremy Saywell (MLT); Jennet Geldybayeva (TKM); Babacar Cisse (SEN); Haley Baxter (NZL); Otgonbayaryn Dölgöön (MGL); Lola Mansour (BEL); Marius Piepke (GER)	Mixed Team	BYE	Osaka; W 4-4 (3-1)	Tokyo; W 5-3	Essen; L 1-6	Silver medal

== Rowing ==
Athlete	Event	Heats		Repechage		Semifinals		Final		Overall Rank
Athlete	Event	Time	Rank	Time	Rank	Time	Rank	Time	Rank	Overall Rank
Hayden Cohen	Boys' Single Sculls	3:30.65	4 QR	3:36.95	2 QA/B	3:35.38	4 QB	3:28.04	2	8
Beatrix Heaphy-Hall; Eve Macfarlane	Girls' Pair	3:34.85	4 QR	3:49.63	1 QA/B	3:41.97	5 QB	3:38.69	1	7

== Sailing ==
One Person Dinghy

Athlete	Event	Race												Points	Rank
Athlete	Event	1	2	3	4	5	6	7	8	9	10	11	M*	Points	Rank
Jack Collinson	Boys' Byte CII	16	4	5	19	14	~~27~~	1	~~21~~	18	16	7	24	124	15
Elise Beavis	Girls' Byte CII	11	10	7	~~DSQ~~	9	~~15~~	6	8	15	11	15	11	103	11

== Shooting ==
Rifle

Athlete	Event	Qualification		Final		
Athlete	Event	Score	Rank	Score	Total	Rank
Jenna Kendall Mackenzie	Girls' 10m Air Rifle	388	13	Did not advance		

== Swimming ==
Athletes	Event	Heat		Semifinal		Final	
Athletes	Event	Time	Position	Time	Position	Time	Position
Matt Stanley	Boys’ 100m Freestyle	52.80	31	Did not advance			
Matt Stanley	Boys’ 200m Freestyle	1:51.21	3 Q			1:51.59	5
Matt Stanley	Boys’ 400m Freestyle	3:58.45	7 Q			3:56.75	7
Chloe Francis	Girls’ 100m Freestyle	58.84	23	Did not advance			
Chloe Francis	Girls’ 200m Freestyle	2:03.92	7 Q			2:03.18	6
Chloe Francis	Girls’ 400m Freestyle	4:22.59	10			Did not advance	
Chloe Francis	Girls’ 100m Breaststroke	1:13.38	15 Q	1:13:03	14	Did not advance	
Chloe Francis	Girls’ 200m Individual Medley	2:16.96	3 Q			2:17.62	5
Renee Stothard	Girls’ 100m Backstroke	1:04.94	16 Q	1:05.11	14	Did not advance	
Renee Stothard	Girls’ 200m Backstroke	2:20.14	18			Did not advance	
Renee Stothard	Girls’ 200m Individual Medley	2:31.22	22			Did not advance	

== Table tennis ==
Individual

Athlete	Event	Round 1		Round 2		Quarterfinals	Semifinals	Final	Rank
Athlete	Event	Group Matches	Rank	Group Matches	Rank	Quarterfinals	Semifinals	Final	Rank
Kevin Wu	Boys' Singles	Onaolapo (NGR); L 1-3 (5-11, 11-7, 8-11, 3-11)	3 qB	Kam (MRI); W 3-2 (6-11, 11-4, 8-11, 11-4, 11-7)	3	Did not advance			25
Kevin Wu	Boys' Singles	Saragovi (ARG); W 3-1 (9-11, 12-10, 17-15, 11-6)	3 qB	Santiwattanatarm (THA); L 0-3 (8-11, 8-11, 8-11)	3	Did not advance			25
Kevin Wu	Boys' Singles	Kim (KOR); L 0-3 (7-11, 2-11, 4-11)	3 qB	Wagner (GER); L 1-3 (7-11, 4-11, 11-6, 9-11)	3	Did not advance			25
Julia Wu	Girls' Singles	Tanioka (JPN); L 0-3 (7-11, 3-11, 4-11)	4 qB	Huang (TPE); L 0-3 (4-11, 5-11, 4-11)	4	Did not advance			29
Julia Wu	Girls' Singles	Loveridge (GBR); L 0-3 (11-13, 9-11, 7-11)	4 qB	Vithanage (SRI); L 0-3 (7-11, 8-11, 8-11)	4	Did not advance			29
Julia Wu	Girls' Singles	Li (SIN); L 0-3 (3-11, 2-11, 5-11)	4 qB	Galic (SLO); L 0-3 (2-11, 5-11, 7-11)	4	Did not advance			29

Team

Athlete	Event	Round 1		Round 2	Quarterfinals	Semifinals	Final	Rank
Athlete	Event	Group Matches	Rank	Round 2	Quarterfinals	Semifinals	Final	Rank
New Zealand; Julia Wu (NZL); Kevin Wu (NZL)	Mixed Team	Croatia; Jeger (CRO); Luka Fucec (CRO); L 0-3 (0-3, 1-3, 1-3)	4 qB	India; Bhandarkar (IND); Das (IND); L 1-2 (0-3, 3-2, 1-3)	Did not advance			25
New Zealand; Julia Wu (NZL); Kevin Wu (NZL)	Mixed Team	Pan American 2 Cordero (PUR); Saragovi (ARG); L 0-3 (0-3, 1-3, 1-3)	4 qB	India; Bhandarkar (IND); Das (IND); L 1-2 (0-3, 3-2, 1-3)	Did not advance			25
New Zealand; Julia Wu (NZL); Kevin Wu (NZL)	Mixed Team	Chinese Taipei; Huang (TPE); Hung (TPE); L 0-3 (0-3, 0-3, 0-3)	4 qB	India; Bhandarkar (IND); Das (IND); L 1-2 (0-3, 3-2, 1-3)	Did not advance			25

== Triathlon ==
Girls

Triathlete	Event	Swimming	Transit 1	Cycling	Transit 2	Running	Total time	Rank
Maddie Dillon	Individual	10:12	0:35	31:31	0:27	19:49	1:02:34.50	8

Men's

Athlete	Event	Swim (1.5 km)	Trans 1	Bike (40 km)	Trans 2	Run (10 km)	Total	Rank
Aaron Barclay	Individual	8:39	0:29	28:39	0:22	16:32	54:41.49	1st place, gold medalist(s)

Mixed

Athlete	Event	Total Times per Athlete (Swim 250 m, Bike 7 km, Run 1.7 km)	Total Group Time	Rank
Ellie Salthouse (AUS); Michael Gosman (AUS); Maddie Dillon (NZL); Aaron Barclay (NZL)	Mixed Team Relay; Oceania 1	20:36; 19:07; 21:11; 19:01	1:19:55.23	2nd place, silver medalist(s)

== Weightlifting ==
Athlete	Event	Snatch	Clean & Jerk	Total	Rank
Joshua Milne	Boys' 69kg	91	110	201	9

== Wrestling ==
Freestyle

Athlete	Event	Pools		Final	Rank
Athlete	Event	Groups	Rank	Final	Rank
Tayla Ford	Girls' 60kg	Baatarzorigyn Battsetseg (MGL); L 0-2 (0–1, 0–2)	4	7th Place Match; Puteri (SIN); W 2–0 (4–0, 4–0)	7
Tayla Ford	Girls' 60kg	Lipatova (RUS); L 0–2 (0–4, 0–4)	4	7th Place Match; Puteri (SIN); W 2–0 (4–0, 4–0)	7
Tayla Ford	Girls' 60kg	Victor (NGR); L 0–2 (0–4, 0–3)	4	7th Place Match; Puteri (SIN); W 2–0 (4–0, 4–0)	7
Tayla Ford	Girls' 60kg	Souare (GUI); W Fall (4–0)	4	7th Place Match; Puteri (SIN); W 2–0 (4–0, 4–0)	7
