= Aaron Barclay =

New Zealand triathlete

Personal information
- Born: 21 October 1992 (age 34)
- Height: 178 cm (5 ft 10 in)
- Weight: 62 kg (137 lb)

Sport
- Country: New Zealand
Medal record
Men's triathlon
Youth Olympic Games
Representing New Zealand
Gold medal – first place	2010 Singapore	Individual
Representing a Mixed-NOCs team
Silver medal – second place	2010 Singapore	Mixed relay

Aaron Barclay (born 21 October 1992) is a triathlete who represents New Zealand internationally. He competed at the 2010 Summer Youth Olympics in Singapore and won the first-ever gold medal awarded for the boys' event. Barclay also subsequently won a silver medal in the mixed relay event, competing for a team representing Oceania. The Games were the first time Barclay had competed outside of Oceania.

== Biography and sporting record ==
Barclay's parents are Craig and Christine Barclay. He attended Gore High School. Barclay had been portrayed as being "visually impaired" and "disabled" as he chooses to race without contact lenses, something his coach said the triathlete was able to overcome without problem. However, this was later revealed as being only semi-true. Barclay requires glasses outside of competition, and had jokingly claimed to be half-blind without them on a questionnaire athletes were made to fill out for Infostrada Sports before the Games, which was picked up on and transmitted as being fact.

At his first international triathlon meet in Gold Coast, Australia in 2009, Barclay finished only 31st, but he improved to finish second in the Oceania Youth Olympic qualifiers before winning individual gold at the Youth Olympics. He won a further silver medal in the mixed relay event, teaming up with New Zealand teammate Maddie Dillon and two Australian triathletes to represent Oceania.

Barclay will take part at the 2010 International Triathlon Union Junior World Championships, before making a decision whether or not to turn professional. He considers Hamish Carter, gold medallist at the 2004 Summer Olympics event, one of his heroes. Barclay now currently is coaching the Macleans College Cycling and Triathlon team.
