= Alois Knabl =

Austrian triathlete (born 1992)

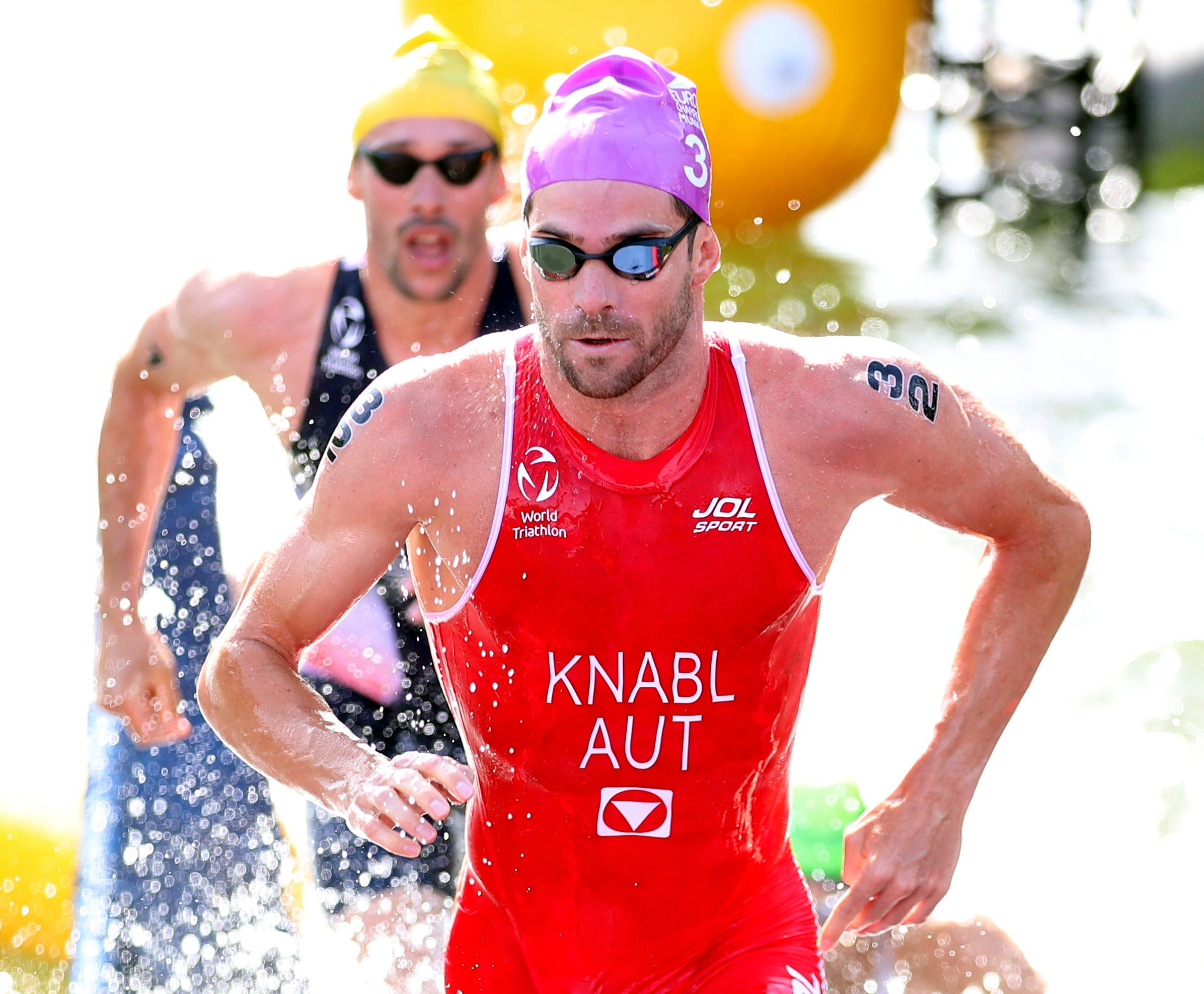
- Knabl in 2022

Personal information
- Nickname: Luis
- Nationality: Austrian
- Born: 16 May 1992 (age 34) Innsbruck, Austria

Sport
- Sport: Triathlon

Alois "Luis" Knabl (born 16 May 1992) is an Austrian triathlete. He competed in the men's event at the 2020 Summer Olympics. However, he was not able to finish due a mechanical problem during the cycling segment of the race. He was also scheduled to compete in the mixed relay event but the Austrian team did not start.

In 2010, he won the bronze medal in the boys' triathlon at the 2010 Summer Youth Olympics held in Singapore. He also won the gold medal in the mixed relay event.
