= Eszter Dudás =

Hungarian triathlete

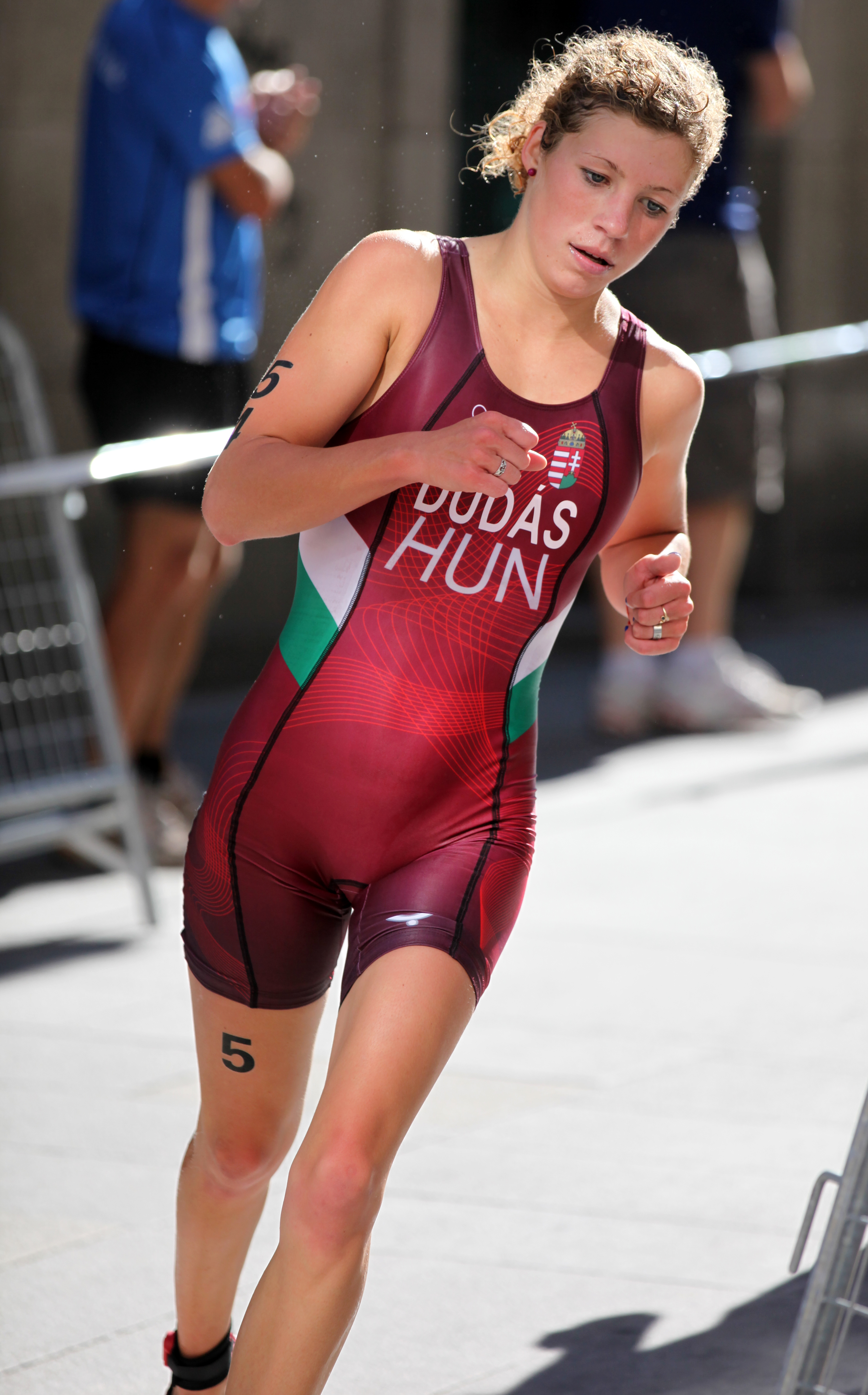
Eszter Dudás running for silver at the European Championships in Pontevedra, 2011.

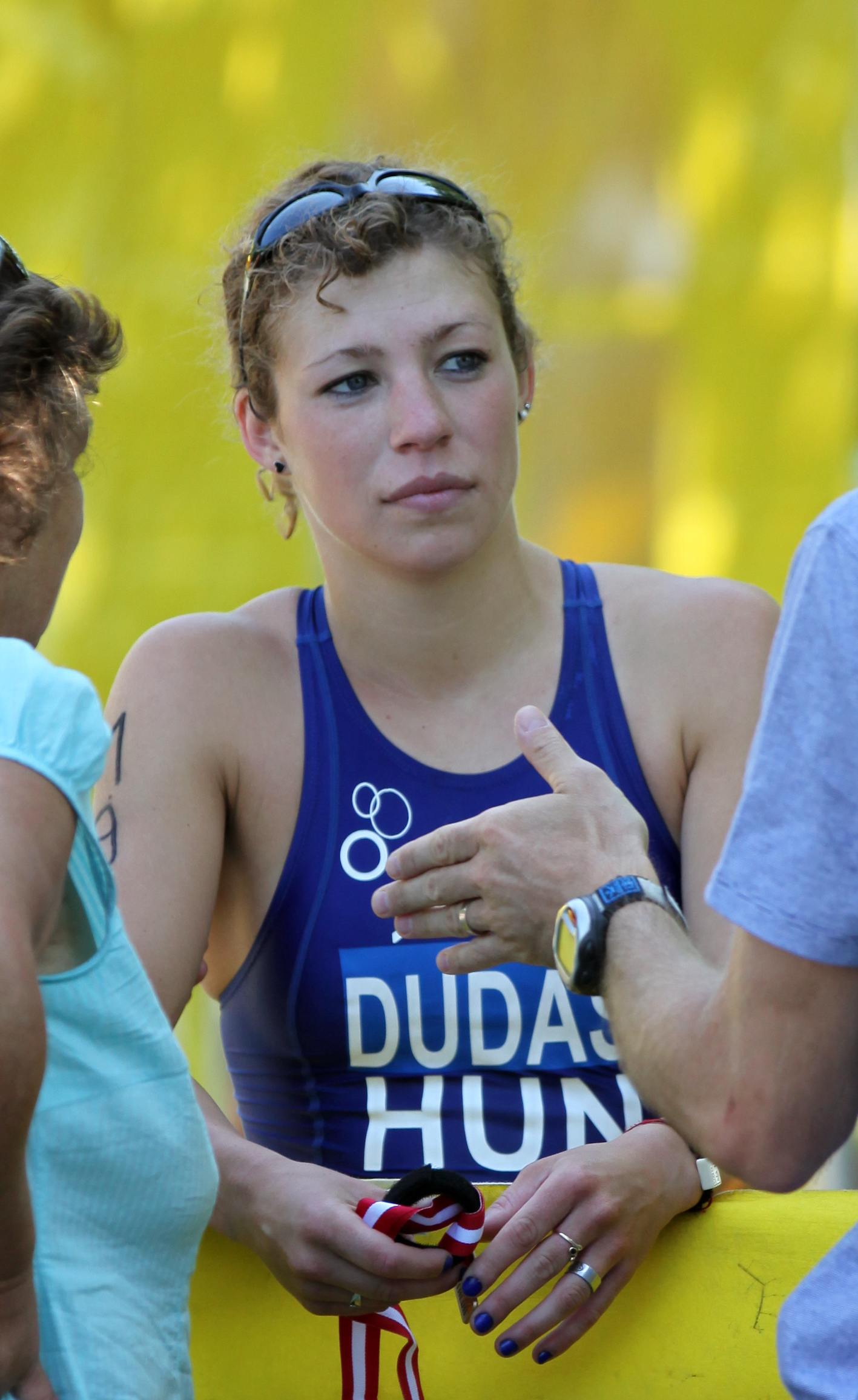
Eszter Dudás after the Vienna City Triathlon, 2011.

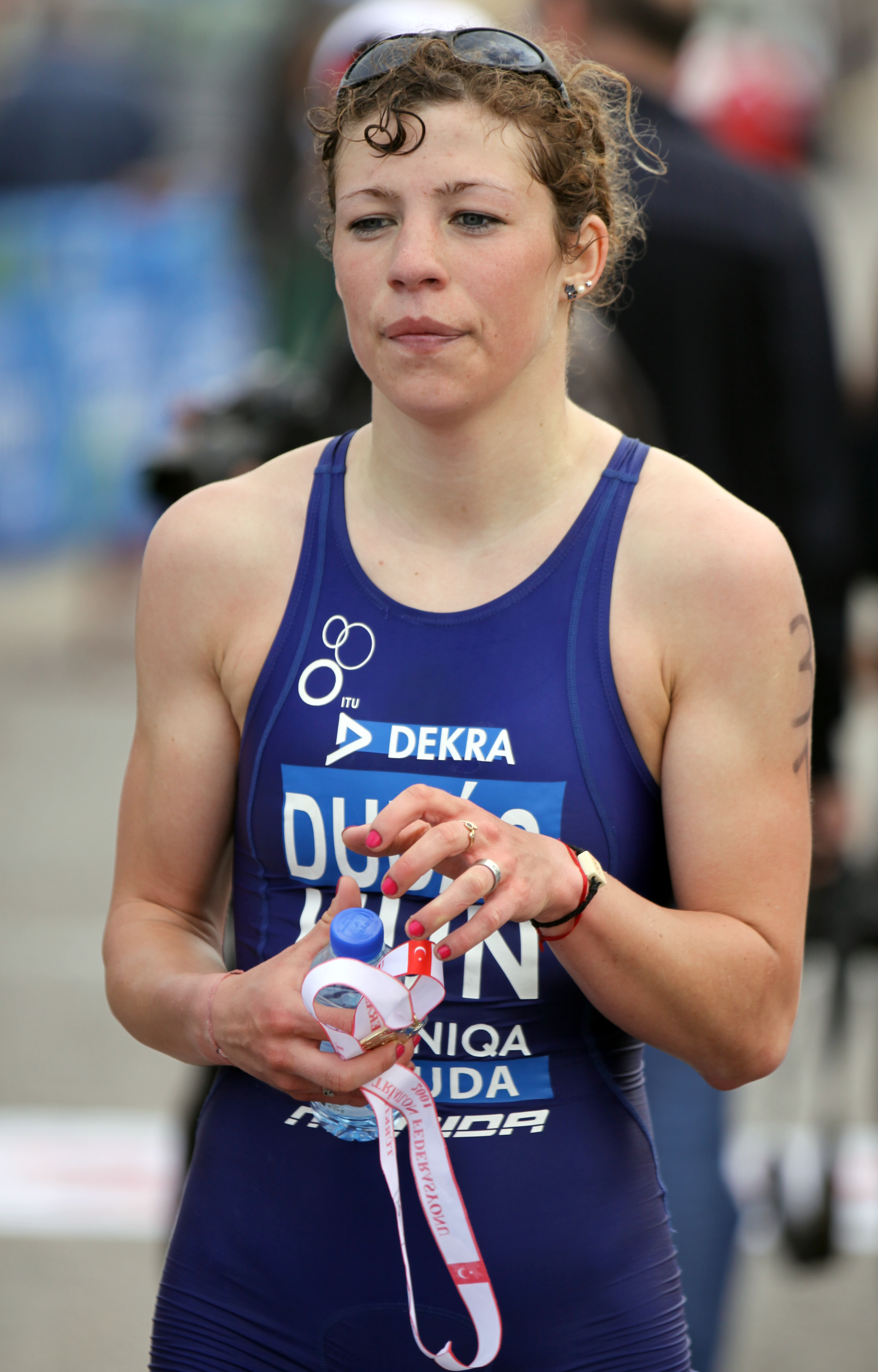
Eszter Dudás immediately after the European Cup elite triathlon in Antalya, 2011.

Eszter Dudás (born 6 March 1992 in Budapest) is a Hungarian professional triathlete, European Junior Vice Champion of the year 2011, and, along with Eszter Pap and Zsófia Tóth, a member of the Heraklesz High Performance Team.

Eszter Dudás is number 6 in the Hungarian elite Ranglista, although she still belongs to the Junior category. Since 2010, Dudás has taken part in elite ITU events as well, e.g. at the African Cup triathlon in Larache she placed 8th, and at the European Cup triathlons in Antalya and Cremona she placed 26th and 19th respectively.

In 2009, Eszter Dudás achieved her international breakthrough in the Junior category, winning gold medals at both the European Duathlon Championships and the European Triathlon Team Championships. In 2010, she won gold in the mixed relay event as part of the European team at the Youth Olympic Games in Singapore. In 2011 Dudás won the silver medal at the European Championships (Junior) and her team with Eszter Pap, David Pap and Gabor Hanko placed fourth.

In Hungary, Dudás represents Uniqa Újbuda Torna Club. Her coach is Csaba Kuttor. Dudás attends the Veres Péter Gimnázium in Budapest.

== ITU Competitions ==
In the three years from 2008 to 2010 Eszter Dudás took part in 17 ITU competitions and achieved 10 top ten positions. The following list is based upon the official ITU rankings and the ITU Athletes's Profile Page. Unless indicated otherwise, the following events are triathlons (Olympic Distance) and refer to the Elite category.

Date	Competition	Place	Rank
2008-05-24	Duathlon European Championships (Junior)	Serres	10
2008-09-06	Junior European Cup	Pulpí	13
2008-09-27	Duathlon World Championships (Junior)	Rimini	15
2009-05-23	Duathlon European Championships (Junior)	Budapest	3
2009-05-24	Duathlon European Championships (Team Relay Junior)	Budapest	1
2009-06-06	Junior European Cup	Vienna	3
2009-06-21	European Championships (Team Relay Youth)	Tarzo Revine	1
2009-07-02	European Championships (Junior)	Holten	12
2009-09-26	European YOG Qualifier	Mar Menor	15
2010-04-30	Duathlon European Championships (Junior)	Nancy	4
2010-05-30	African Cup	Larache	8
2010-06-12	Junior European Cup	Vienna	1
2010-07-03	European Championships (Junior)	Athlone	13
2010-08-07	Junior European Cup	Tiszaújváros	3
2010-08-14	Youth Olympic Games	Singapore	5
2010-08-14	Youth Olympic Games (4x Mixed Relay)	Singapore	1
2010-09-08	Dextro Energy World Championship Series, Grand Final: Junior World Championship	Budapest	19
2011-04-03	European Cup	Antalya	26
2011-06-11	Junior European Cup	Vienna	4
2011-06-12	Sprint European Cup	Cremona	19
2011-06-24	European Championships (Junior)	Pontevedra	2
2011-06-26	European Championships (Junior Mix Relay)	Pontevedra	4
