= Judo at the 2010 Summer Youth Olympics – Mixed team =

Judo competition

The Mixed Team tournament in Judo at the 2010 Summer Youth Olympics was held on August 25 at the International Convention Centre.

Athletes of all weight classes were split into groups of 7 or 8 athletes in one of 12 teams. The tournament bracket consisted of a single-elimination contest where the team with the most wins moves to the next round culminating in a gold match. There were no repechages in this event, the two losing semi-finalists received bronze medals.

== Medalists ==
Gold	Essen
Silver	Belgrade
Bronze	Cairo
Bronze	Tokyo

== Teams ==
(Spain) Barcelona	(Serbia) Belgrade	(United Kingdom) Birmingham	(Egypt) Cairo
Julia Rosso-Richetto (FRA); Subash Yadav (IND); Yu-Chun Wu (TPE); Maxamillian Schneider (USA); Natalia Rak (EST); Michael Greiter (AUT); Gulnoza Matniyazova (UZB); Bolot Toktogonov (KGZ)	Anna Dmitrieva (RUS); Jeremy Saywell (MLT); Jennet Geldybayeva (TKM); Babacar Cisse (SEN); Haley Baxter (NZL); Dulguun Otgonbayar (MGL); Lola Mansour (BEL); Marius Piepke (GER)	Fahariya Takidine (COM); Ecaterina Guica (CAN); Song Chol Hyon (PRK); Neo Kapenko (BOT); Chin Jie Lim (SIN); Kadijah Maxwell (BAR); Krisztian Toth (HUN)	Neha Thakur (IND); Mansurkhuja Muminkhujaev (UZB); Christine Huck (AUT); Ioan Visan (ROU); Andrea Guillen (CRC); Eldin Omerovic (BIH); Barbara Matic (CRO); Pedro Pineda (VEN)
(Japan) Chiba	(Germany) Essen	(New Zealand) Hamilton	(Germany) Munich
Dieulourdes Joseph (HAI); Diau Bauro (FIJ); Alexandra Pop (ROU); Phuc Cai (DEN); Sophio Beridze (GEO); Rijad Dedeic (MNE); Ryosuke Igarashi (JPN)	Lesly Cano (PER); Pedro Rivadulla (ESP); Andrea Krisandova (SVK); Kairat Agibayev (KAZ); Daryl Lokuku Ngambomo (COD); Miku Tashiro (JPN); Alex Maxell Garcia Mendoza (CUB)	Cynthia Rahming (BAH); Paolo Persoglia (SMR); Odette Giuffrida (ITA); Davit Ghazaryan (ARM); Wildjie Vertus (HAI); Jae Hyung Lee (KOR); Una Svetlana Tuba (SRB); Anis Shalabi (LBA)	Vita Valnova (BLR); Kęstutis Vitkauskas (LTU); Un Ju Ri (PRK); Beka Tugushi (GEO); Jalil Jalilov (AZE); Caren Chammas (LIB); Yacov Mamistvalov (ISR)
(United States) New York	(Japan) Osaka	(France) Paris	(Japan) Tokyo
Katelyn Bouyssou (USA); Dmytro Atanov (UKR); Julanda Bacaj (ALB); Matheus Marcia Machado (BRA); Dilara Incedayi (TUR); Ghenadie Pretivatii (MDA); Milica Savic (BIH); Mateija Glusac (SRB)	Sothea Sam (CAM); Abdulrahman Anter (YEM); Jing Fang Tang (SIN); Brandon Arends (ARU); Laura Naginskaite (LTU); Alexios Ntanatsidis (GRE); Natalia Kubin (GER); Bruno Abel Villalba (ARG)	Barbara Batizi (HUN); Patrick Marxer (LIE); Maja Rasinska (POL); Farshid Ghasemi Asl (IRI); Sophina Arrey (CMR); Khasan Khalmurzaev (RUS); Sana Khelifi (ALG); Fernando Vanoye (MEX)	Seul Bi Bae (KOR); Fabio Basile (ITA); Gaelle Nemorin (MRI); Patrik Ferreira Martins (AND); Rotem Shor (ISR); Kevin Fernandez (HON); Kseniya Darchuk (UKR); Batuhan Efemgil (TUR)

== Results ==
=== Main Bracket ===
Round of 16
Munich	3
Essen	4
Cairo	5
Birmingham	2
Paris	3
Tokyo	5
Barcelona	3
Osaka	5

Quarterfinals
Essen	5
Chiba	2
Cairo	4^{3}
Hamilton	4^{2}
Tokyo	4^{3}
New York	4^{2}
Osaka	4^{1}
Belgrade	4^{3}

Semifinals
Essen	5
Cairo	2
Tokyo	3
Belgrade	5

Finals
Essen	6
Belgrade	1
