= Senegal at the 2010 Summer Youth Olympics =

- IOC code: SEN
- NOC: Comité National Olympique et Sportif Sénégalais

in Singapore
- Competitors: 6 in 5 sports
- Flag bearer: Daouda Diagne
- Medals: Gold 0 Silver 0 Bronze 0 Total 0

Summer Youth Olympics appearances
- 2010; 2014; 2018; 2026

Senegal competed at the 2010 Summer Youth Olympics, the inaugural Youth Olympic Games, held in Singapore from 14 August to 26 August 2010.

== Medalists ==
Medal	Name	Sport	Event	Date
Silver	Babacar Cisse	Judo	Mixed Team	25 Aug

== Athletics ==
=== Boys ===
Track and Road Events

Athletes	Event	Qualification		Final	
Athletes	Event	Result	Rank	Result	Rank
Daouda Diagne	Boys' 100m	11.23	17 qC	11.17	16

== Fencing ==
Group stage

Athlete	Event	Match 1	Match 2	Match 3	Match 4	Match 5	Match 6	Seed
Mame Ndao	Girls’ Foil	Jaoude (LIB); L 3-5	Goldie (CAN); L 1-5	Alekseeva (RUS); L 2-5	Shaito (USA); L 0-5	Daw (EGY); L 2-5	Mancini (ITA); L 1-5	13

Knock-Out Stage

Athlete	Event	Round of 16	Quarterfinals	Semifinals	Final	Rank
Mame Ndao	Girls’ Foil	Shaito (USA); L 1-15	Did not advance			13

== Judo ==
Individual

Athlete	Event	Round 1	Round 2	Round 3	Semifinals	Final	Rank
Athlete	Event	Opposition Result	Opposition Result	Opposition Result	Opposition Result	Opposition Result	Rank
Babacar Cisse	Boys' -66 kg	BYE	Kairat Agibayev (KAZ); L 000-100	Repechage; Arends (ARU); W 100-000	Repechage; Visan (ROU); L 000-100	Did not advance	9

Team

Team	Event	Round 1	Round 2	Semifinals	Final	Rank
Team	Event	Opposition Result	Opposition Result	Opposition Result	Opposition Result	Rank
Belgrade; Anna Dmitrieva (RUS); Jeremy Saywell (MLT); Jennet Geldybayeva (TKM); Babacar Cisse (SEN); Haley Baxter (NZL); Dulguun Otgonbayar (MGL); Lola Mansour (BEL); Marius Piepke (GER)	Mixed Team	BYE	Osaka; W 4-4 (3-1)	Tokyo; W 5-3	Essen; L 1-6	Silver medal

== Swimming ==
Athletes	Event	Heat		Semifinal		Final	
Athletes	Event	Time	Position	Time	Position	Time	Position
Francois Mallack	Boys' 50m Freestyle	DNS		Did not advance			
Francois Mallack	Boys' 100m Freestyle	1:01.21	49	Did not advance			
Zeynab Ba	Girls' 50m Freestyle	31.85	53	Did not advance			
Zeynab Ba	Girls' 100m Freestyle	1:12.66	52	Did not advance			

== Taekwondo ==
Athlete	Event	Preliminary	Quarterfinal	Semifinal	Final	Rank
Ndeye Coumba Diop	Girls' -55kg	BYE	Jennifer Agren (SWE); L DSQ	Did not advance		5
