= Aruba at the 2010 Summer Youth Olympics =

- IOC code: ARU
- NOC: Comité Olímpico Arubano

in Singapore
- Competitors: 4 in 3 sports
- Flag bearer: Saskia Postma
- Medals: Gold 0 Silver 0 Bronze 0 Total 0

Summer Youth Olympics appearances
- 2010; 2014; 2018

Aruba participated in the 2010 Summer Youth Olympics in Singapore.

The Aruba team consisted of 4 athletes competing in 3 sports: judo, sailing and swimming.

== Judo ==
Individual

Athlete	Event	Round 1	Round 2	Round 3	Semifinals	Final	Rank
Athlete	Event	Opposition Result	Opposition Result	Opposition Result	Opposition Result	Opposition Result	Rank
Brandon Arends	Boys' -66 kg	BYE	Hyon (PRK); L 000-110	Repechage; Cisse (SEN); L 000-100	Did not advance		13

Team

Team	Event	Round 1	Round 2	Semifinals	Final	Rank
Team	Event	Opposition Result	Opposition Result	Opposition Result	Opposition Result	Rank
Osaka; Sothea Sam (CAM); Abdulrahman Anter (YEM); Jing Fang Tang (SIN); Brandon Arends (ARU); Laura Naginskaite (LTU); Alexios Ntanatsidis (GRE); Natalia Kubin (GER); Bruno Abel Villalba (ARG)	Mixed Team	Barcelona; W 5-3	Belgrade; L 4-4 (1-3)	Did not advance		5

== Sailing ==
One Person Dinghy

Athlete	Event	Race												Points	Rank
Athlete	Event	1	2	3	4	5	6	7	8	9	10	11	M	Points	Rank
Nicole van der Velden	Girls' Byte CII	~~29~~	29	~~31~~	29	24	21	25	26	23	25	25	31	258	27

== Swimming ==
Athletes	Event	Heat		Semifinal		Final	
Athletes	Event	Time	Position	Time	Position	Time	Position
Jonathan Ponson	Boys’ 100m Freestyle	54.14	38	Did not advance			
Jonathan Ponson	Boys’ 50m Butterfly	25.59	9 Q	25.51	9	Did not advance	
Saskia Postma	Girls’ 200m Freestyle	2:13.64	38			Did not advance	
Saskia Postma	Girls’ 400m Freestyle	4:41.63	25			Did not advance	
