= Malta at the 2010 Summer Youth Olympics =

- IOC code: MLT
- NOC: Malta Olympic Committee

in Singapore
- Competitors: 4 in 3 sports
- Flag bearer: Jeremy Saywell
- Medals: Gold 0 Silver 0 Bronze 0 Total 0

Summer Youth Olympics appearances
- 2010; 2014; 2018

Malta participated in the 2010 Summer Youth Olympics in Singapore.

== Medalists ==
Medal	Name	Sport	Event	Date
Silver	Jeremy Saywell	Judo	Mixed Team	25 Aug

== Athletics ==
=== Girls ===
Track and Road Events

Athletes	Event	Qualification		Final	
Athletes	Event	Result	Rank	Result	Rank
Tamara Vella	Girls’ 100m	13.11	22 qD	13.16	22
Marija Sciberras	Girls’ 100m Hurdles	14.82	15 qC	14.69	14

== Judo ==
Individual

Athlete	Event	Round 1	Round 2	Round 3	Semifinals	Final	Rank
Athlete	Event	Opposition Result	Opposition Result	Opposition Result	Opposition Result	Opposition Result	Rank
Jeremy Saywell	Boys' -66 kg	BYE	Vitkauskas (LTU); L 000-100	Repechage; Cai (DEN); L 000-101	Did not advance		13

Team

Team	Event	Round 1	Round 2	Semifinals	Final	Rank
Team	Event	Opposition Result	Opposition Result	Opposition Result	Opposition Result	Rank
Belgrade; Anna Dmitrieva (RUS); Jeremy Saywell (MLT); Jennet Geldybayeva (TKM); Babacar Cisse (SEN); Haley Baxter (NZL); Dulguun Otgonbayar (MGL); Lola Mansour (BEL); Marius Piepke (GER)	Mixed Team	BYE	Osaka; W 4-4 (3-1)	Tokyo; W 5-3	Essen; L 1-6	Silver medal

== Swimming ==
Athletes	Event	Heat		Semifinal		Final	
Athletes	Event	Time	Position	Time	Position	Time	Position
Mark Sammut	Boys’ 100m Backstroke	1:01.80	29	Did not advance			
Mark Sammut	Boys’ 200m Backstroke	2:16.85	18			Did not advance	
