= Lithuania at the 2010 Summer Youth Olympics =

- IOC code: LTU
- NOC: Lithuanian National Olympic Committee
- Website: www.ltok.lt (in Lithuanian and English)

in Singapore
- Competitors: 24 in 10 sports
- Flag bearer: Mantas Jusis
- Medals Ranked 19th: Gold 3 Silver 0 Bronze 1 Total 4

Summer Youth Olympics appearances (overview)
- 2010; 2014; 2018

Lithuania participated in the 2010 Summer Youth Olympics in Singapore City, Singapore. 24 athletes received the right to participate in championships: 7 track and field athletes, 4 basketball players, 3 swimmers, 2 boxers, 2 modern pentathlon athletes, 2 judo athletes, 1 gymnast, 1 rower, 1 canoer, 1 sailer.

== Medalists ==
Medal	Name	Sport	Event	Date
Gold	Rolandas Maščinskas	Rowing	Junior Men's Single Sculls	18 Aug
Gold	Evaldas Petrauskas	Boxing	Men's Light 60kg	25 Aug
Gold	Ričardas Kuncaitis	Boxing	Men's Light Welter 64 kg	25 Aug
Bronze	Laura Naginskaitė	Judo	Girls' -63 kg	22 Aug
Bronze	(Lithuania) Lukas Kontrimavičius (Russia) Gulnaz Gubaydullina	Modern pentathlon	Mixed relay	24 Aug

== Qualified athletes ==
=== Athletics ===
==== Boys ====
Track and Road Events

Athletes	Event	Qualification		Final	
Athletes	Event	Result	Rank	Result	Rank
Marius Šavelskis	Boys' 10km Walk			DSQ	

Field Events

Athletes	Event	Qualification		Final	
Athletes	Event	Result	Rank	Result	Rank
Martynas Šedys	Boys' Hammer Throw	72.15	3rd Q	68.57	5th
Mantas Jusis	Boys' Shot Put	18.46	9th qB	18.96	9th
Marius Simanavičius	Boys' Javelin Throw	76.17 ^{1}	2nd Q	71.76	6th

^{1} - Athlete reached national 17 y.o. record.

==== Girls ====
Track and Road Events

Athletes	Event	Qualification		Final	
Athletes	Event	Result	Rank	Result	Rank
Diana Kačanova	Girls' 5km Walk			24:36.76	11th

Field Events

Athletes	Event	Qualification		Final	
Athletes	Event	Result	Rank	Result	Rank
Dovilė Dzindzaletaitė	Girls' Triple Jump	12.01	10th qB	12.40	9th
Laura Gedminaitė	Girls' Shot Put	14.83	4th Q	15.15	4th

=== Basketball ===
Boys

Squad List	Event	Group Stage		Placement Stage			Rank
Squad List	Event	Group B	Rank	1st-8th	5th-8th	5th-6th	Rank
Martynas Pauliukėnas (C); Mantas Mockevičius; Rokas Narkevičius; Marius Užupis	Boys' Basketball	Panama; W 33-14	2nd Q	Serbia; L 22-33	Spain; W 34-14	Israel; W 28-24	5th
Martynas Pauliukėnas (C); Mantas Mockevičius; Rokas Narkevičius; Marius Užupis	Boys' Basketball	Iran; W 29-18	2nd Q	Serbia; L 22-33	Spain; W 34-14	Israel; W 28-24	5th
Martynas Pauliukėnas (C); Mantas Mockevičius; Rokas Narkevičius; Marius Užupis	Boys' Basketball	Egypt; L 31-33	2nd Q	Serbia; L 22-33	Spain; W 34-14	Israel; W 28-24	5th
Martynas Pauliukėnas (C); Mantas Mockevičius; Rokas Narkevičius; Marius Užupis	Boys' Basketball	Argentina; L 27-31	2nd Q	Serbia; L 22-33	Spain; W 34-14	Israel; W 28-24	5th

=== Boxing ===
Boys

Athlete	Event	Preliminaries	Semifinals	Final	Rank
Evaldas Petrauskas	Lightweight (60kg)	Thomas Vahrenholt (GER); W 6-2	Krishan Vikas (IND); W 4-3	Brett Mather (AUS); W 13-4	Gold medal
Ricardas Kuncaitis	Light Welterweight (64kg)		Oleg Nekliudov (UKR); W 5-4	Samuel Zapata (VEN); W 12-6	Gold medal

=== Canoeing ===
Boys

Athlete	Event	Time Trial		Round 1	Round 2 (Rep)	Round 3	Round 4	Round 5	Final
Athlete	Event	Time	Rank	Round 1	Round 2 (Rep)	Round 3	Round 4	Round 5	Final
Elvis Sutkus	Boys’ K1 Slalom	DNS		did not advance					
Elvis Sutkus	Boys’ K1 Sprint	1:33.06	5	Prskavec (CZE); W 1:33.10-1:51.29		Zelnychenko (UKR); L DNF-1:35.63	did not advance		

=== Gymnastics ===
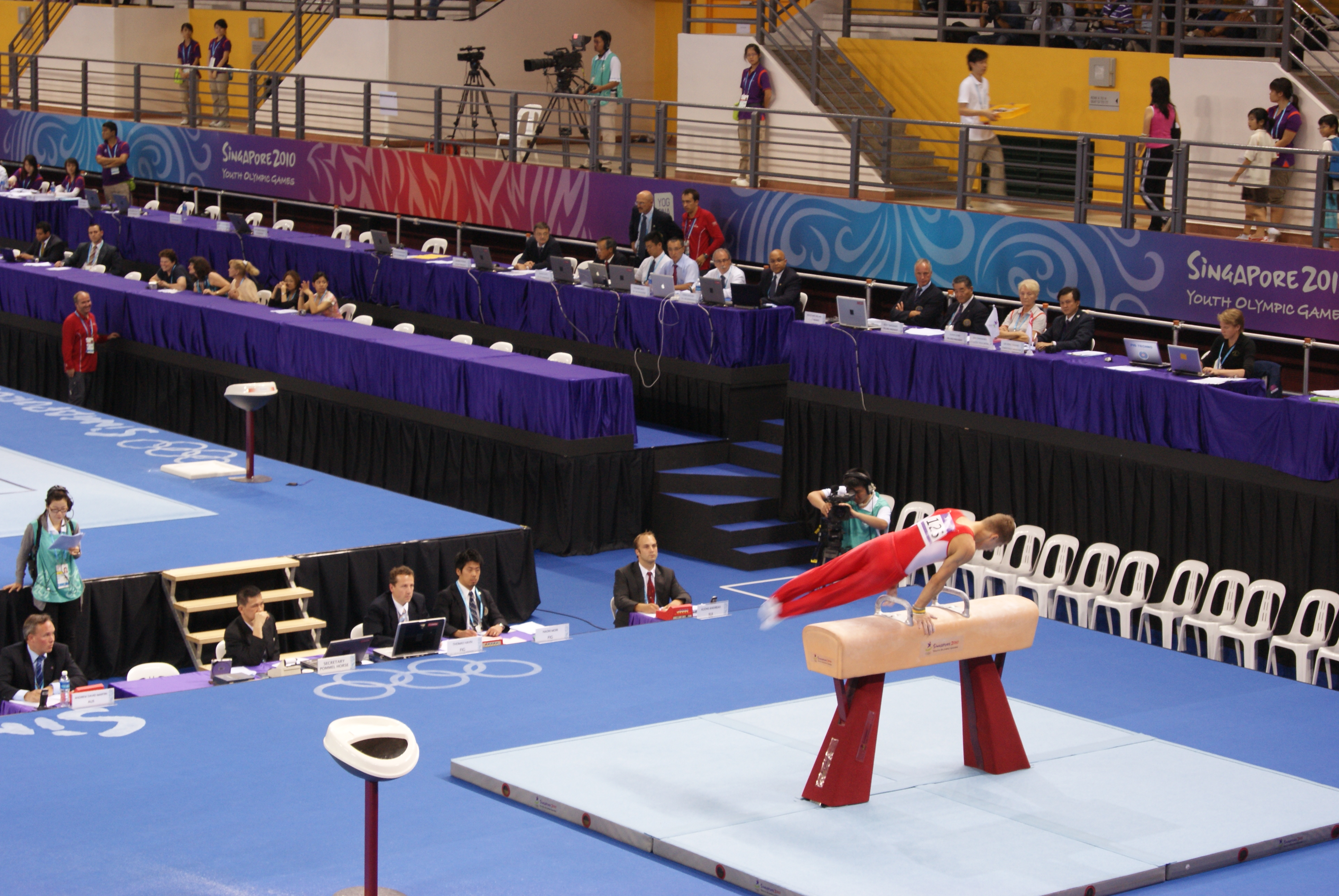
Tvorogalas on the pommel horse during the artistic gymnastics competition at the Bishan Sports Hall on 16 August 2010

==== Artistic Gymnastics ====
Boys

Athlete	Event	Floor		Pommel Horse		Rings		Vault		Parallel Bars		Horizontal Bar		Total	
Athlete	Event	Score	Rank	Score	Rank	Score	Rank	Score	Rank	Score	Rank	Score	Rank	Score	Rank
Robert Tvorogal	Boys' Qualification	13.200	28	13.050	22	12.050	36	14.850	27	13.100	22	14.150	2 Q	80.400	23

Athlete	Event	Score	Rank
Robert Tvorogal	Boys' Horizontal Bar	13.925	7

=== Judo ===
Individual

Athlete	Event	Round 1	Round 2	Round 3	Semifinals	Final	Rank
Athlete	Event	Opposition Result	Opposition Result	Opposition Result	Opposition Result	Opposition Result	Rank
Kęstutis Vitkauskas	Boys' -66 kg	BYE	Saywell (MLT); W 100-000	Ghazaryan (ARM); L 000-001	Repechage; Asl (IRI); L 000-012	Did not advance	9
Laura Naginskaite	Girls' -63 kg	BYE	Baxter (NZL); W 102-000	Matniyazova (UZB); W 010-000	Gomes (BRA); L 000-002	Bronze Medal Match; Shor (ISR); W 100-000	

Team

Team	Event	Round 1	Round 2	Semifinals	Final	Rank
Team	Event	Opposition Result	Opposition Result	Opposition Result	Opposition Result	Rank
Munich; Vita Valnova (BLR); Kęstutis Vitkauskas (LTU); Un Ju Ri (PRK); Beka Tugushi (GEO); Jalil Jalilov (AZE); Caren Chammas (LIB); Yacov Mamistvalov (ISR)	Mixed Team	Essen; L 3-4	did not advance			9
Osaka; Sothea Sam (CAM); Abdulrahman Anter (YEM); Jing Fang Tang (SIN); Brandon Arends (ARU); Laura Naginskaite (LTU); Alexios Ntanatsidis (GRE); Natalia Kubin (GER); Bruno Abel Villalba (ARG)	Mixed Team	Barcelona; W 5-3	Belgrade; L 4-4 (1-3)	did not advance		5

=== Modern pentathlon ===
Athlete	Event	Fencing (Épée One Touch)			Swimming (200m Freestyle)			Running & Shooting (3000m, Laser Pistol)			Total Points	Final Rank
Athlete	Event	Results	Rank	Points	Time	Rank	Points	Time	Rank	Points	Total Points	Final Rank
Lukas Kontrimavicius	Boys' Individual	11-12	14	800	2:09.68	10	1244	11:11.74	6	2316	4360	9
Gintare Venckauskaite	Girls' Individual	8-15	19	680	2:26.12	14	1048	11:42.28	1	2192	3920	6
Gulnaz Gubaydullina (RUS); Lukas Kontrimavicius (LTU)	Mixed Relay	35-57	22	710	1:59.05	2	1372	14:59.91	1	2484	4566	Bronze medal
Gintare Venckauskaite (LTU); Martin Bilko (CZE)	Mixed Relay	40-52	18	760	2:05.10	12	1300	15:28.38	5	2368	4428	9

=== Rowing ===
Boys

Athletes	Event	Heat Round 1		Semifinal		Final	
Athletes	Event	Result	Rank	Result	Rank	Result	Rank
Rolandas Maščinskas	Single sculls	3:22.68	3rd Q	3.25.71	3rd Q	3:13.82	Gold

=== Sailing ===
Boys

Athlete	Event	Race												Points	Final Rank
Athlete	Event	1	2	3	4	5	6	7	8	9	10	11	M	Points	Final Rank
Valerijus Ovčinnikovas	One Person Dinghy (Byte CII)	13	~~29~~	~~29~~	23	28	23	14	26	24	22	22	28	223	26

=== Swimming ===
Boys

Athletes	Event	Heat Round 1		Semifinal		Final	
Athletes	Event	Result	Rank	Result	Rank	Result	Rank
Vaidotas Blažys	50 m breaststroke	29.74	9th Q	29.58	8th Q	29.71	8th
Vaidotas Blažys	100 m breaststroke	1.06.13	20th	Did not advance			

Girls

Athletes	Event	Heat Round 1		Semifinal		Final	
Athletes	Event	Result	Rank	Result	Rank	Result	Rank
Urtė Kazakevičiūtė	50 m breaststroke	33.12	7th Q	33.05	8th Q	33.22	8th
Urtė Kazakevičiūtė	100 breaststroke	1:11.67	6th Q	1:11.63	6th Q	1:11.63	8th
Urtė Kazakevičiūtė	200 breaststroke	2:35.68	8th Q			2:37.33	8th
Jūratė Ščerbinskaitė	200 freestyle	2:07.97	25th	Did not advance			
Jūratė Ščerbinskaitė	400 freestyle	4:33.08	20th	Did not advance			
