= Uzbekistan at the 2010 Summer Youth Olympics =

- IOC code: UZB
- NOC: National Olympic Committee of the Republic of Uzbekistan

in Singapore
- Competitors: 21 in 10 sports
- Flag bearer: Sardorbek Begaliev
- Medals Ranked 61st: Gold 0 Silver 2 Bronze 5 Total 7

Summer Youth Olympics appearances (overview)
- 2010; 2014; 2018

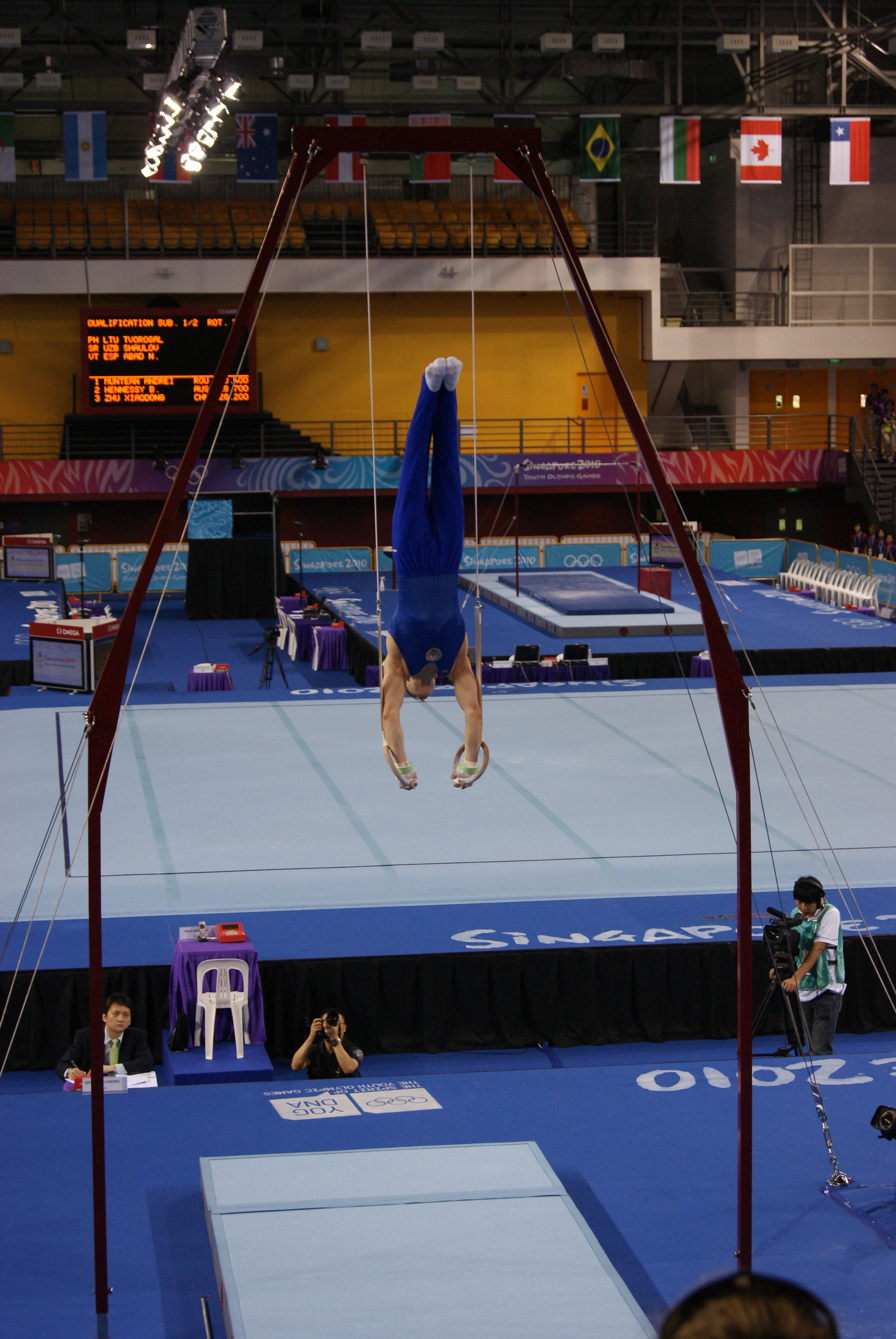
Eduard Shaulov performing on the rings during the artistic gymnastics competition on 16 August 2010 at Bishan Sports Hall, Singapore

Uzbekistan competed in the 2010 Youth Summer Olympics in Singapore.

== Medalists ==
| Medal | Name | Sport | Event | Date |
|---|---|---|---|---|
| Silver | Mansurkhuja Muminkhujaev | Judo | Boys' 55 kg | 21 Aug |
| Silver | Ahmad Mamadjanov | Boxing | Men's Welter 69 kg | 25 Aug |
| Bronze | Ruslan Kamilov | Wrestling | Boys' Greco-Roman 85 kg | 15 Aug |
| Bronze | Nilufar Gadaeva | Wrestling | Girls' Freestyle 52 kg | 16 Aug |
| Bronze | Dierbek Ergashev | Wrestling | Boys' Freestyle 76 kg | 17 Aug |
| Bronze | Zohidjon Hoorboyev | Boxing | Men's Light Fly 48 kg | 24 Aug |
| Bronze | Sardorbek Begaliev | Boxing | Men's Light Heavy 81 kg | 24 Aug |
| Bronze | Mansurkhuja Muminkhujaev | Judo | Mixed Team | 25 Aug |

Nurbek Hakkulov was disqualified after testing positive for a banned substance. He was stripped of his silver medal.

== Athletics ==
=== Boys ===
Field Events

| Athletes | Event | Qualification | | Final | |
| Athletes | Event | Result | Rank | Result | Rank |
|---|---|---|---|---|---|
| Ruslan Kurbanov | Boys' Triple Jump | 15.32 | 6 Q | 15.48 | 6 |

=== Girls ===
Field Events

| Athletes | Event | Qualification | | Final | |
| Athletes | Event | Result | Rank | Result | Rank |
|---|---|---|---|---|---|
| Anastasiya Baykova | Girls' Triple Jump | 12.33 | 6 Q | 12.39 | 7 |

== Boxing ==
Boys

| Athlete | Event | Preliminaries | Semifinals | Final | Rank |
|---|---|---|---|---|---|
| Zohidjon Hoorboyev | Light Flyweight (48kg) | Haziza Matusi (RWA); W 7–1 | Ryan Burnett (IRL); L 1–2 | 3rd Place Bout; Mohd Hamid (SIN); W 7–0 | Bronze medal |
| Ahmad Mamadjanov | Welterweight (69kg) | | Nursahat Pazziyev (TKM); W 2–0 | David Lourenco (BRA); L 3–7 | Silver medal |
| Sardorbek Begaliev | Light Heavyweight (81kg) | Bijan Khojasteh (IRI); W 4–2 | Irosvani Duverger (CUB); L 1–3 | 3rd Place Bout; Ytalo Perea (ECU); W 5–2 | Bronze medal |

== Gymnastics ==
=== Artistic Gymnastics ===
Boys

| Athlete | Event | Floor | | Pommel Horse | | Rings | | Vault | | Parallel Bars | | Horizontal Bar | | Total | |
| Athlete | Event | Score | Rank | Score | Rank | Score | Rank | Score | Rank | Score | Rank | Score | Rank | Score | Rank |
|---|---|---|---|---|---|---|---|---|---|---|---|---|---|---|---|
| Eduard Shaulov | Boys' Qualification | 13.800 | 15 | 13.500 | 12 | 12.100 | 35 | 15.500 | 12 | 13.600 | 13 | 13.250 | 21 | 81.750 | 13 Q |
| Eduard Shaulov | Boys' Individual All-Around | 13.850 | 8 | 12.250 | 15 | 12.800 | 17 | 15.200 | 8 | 12.200 | 18 | 13.400 | 11 | 79.700 | 16 |

Girls

| Athlete | Event | Vault | | Uneven Bars | | Beam | | Floor | | Total | |
| Athlete | Event | Score | Rank | Score | Rank | Score | Rank | Score | Rank | Score | Rank |
|---|---|---|---|---|---|---|---|---|---|---|---|
| Dilnoza Abdusalimova | Girls' Qualification | 13.100 | 26 | 11.900 | 23 | 13.500 | 11 | 12.700 | 15 | 51.200 | 15 Q |
| Dilnoza Abdusalimova | Girls' Individual All-Around | 13.450 | 12 | 12.350 | 13 | 12.350 | 15 | 12.550 | 14 | 50.700 | 14 |

=== Rhythmic Gymnastics ===
Individual

| Athlete | Event | Qualification | | | | | | Final | | | | | |
| Athlete | Event | Rope | Hoop | Ball | Clubs | Total | Rank | Rope | Hoop | Ball | Clubs | Total | Rank |
|---|---|---|---|---|---|---|---|---|---|---|---|---|---|
| Aziza Mamadjanova | Girls' Individual All-Around | 22.325 | 22.400 | 22.975 | 22.650 | 90.350 | 9 | Did not advance | | | | | |

== Judo ==
Individual

| Athlete | Event | Round 1 | Round 2 | Round 3 | Round 4 | Semifinals | Final | Rank |
| Athlete | Event | Opposition Result | Opposition Result | Opposition Result | Opposition Result | Opposition Result | Opposition Result | Rank |
|---|---|---|---|---|---|---|---|---|
| Mansurkhuja Muminkhujaev | Boys' −55 kg | BYE | Takidine (COM); W 100–000 | | | Yadav (IND); W 003–000 | Pulkrabek (CZE); L 001–010 | Silver medal |
| Gulnoza Matniyazova | Girls' −63 kg | BYE | Chammas (LIB); W 101–000 | Naginskaite (LTU); L 000–010 | Repechage; Arrey (CMR); W 110–000 | Repechage; Chammas (LIB); W 001–000 | Bronze Medal Match; Matic (CRO); L 000–001 | 5 |

Team

| Team | Event | Round 1 | Round 2 | Semifinals | Final | Rank |
| Team | Event | Opposition Result | Opposition Result | Opposition Result | Opposition Result | Rank |
|---|---|---|---|---|---|---|
| Cairo; Neha Thakur (IND); Mansurkhuja Muminkhujaev (UZB); Christine Huck (AUT); Ioan Visan (ROU); Andrea Guillen (CRC); Eldin Omerovic (BIH); Barbara Matic (CRO); Pedro Pineda (VEN) | Mixed Team | Birmingham; W 5–2 | Hamilton; W 4–4 (3–2) | Essen; L 2–5 | Did not advance | Bronze medal |
| Barcelona; Julia Rosso-Richetto (FRA); Subash Yadav (IND); Yu-Chun Wu (TPE); Maxamillian Schneider (USA); Natalia Rak (EST); Michael Greiter (AUT); Gulnoza Matniyazova (UZB); Bolot Toktogonov (KGZ) | Mixed Team | Osaka; L 3–5 | Did not advance | | | 9 |

== Shooting ==
Pistol

| Athlete | Event | Qualification | | Final | | |
| Athlete | Event | Score | Rank | Score | Total | Rank |
|---|---|---|---|---|---|---|
| Lenaza Asanova | Girls' 10m Air Pistol | 371 | 9 | Did not advance | | |

== Swimming ==
| Athletes | Event | Heat | | Semifinal | | Final | |
| Athletes | Event | Time | Position | Time | Position | Time | Position |
|---|---|---|---|---|---|---|---|
| Dmitriy Shvetsov | Boys' 200m Breaststroke | 2:20.93 | 13 | | | Did not advance | |
| Dmitriy Shvetsov | Boys' 200m Individual Medley | 2:06.94 | 17 | | | Did not advance | |
| Yulduz Kuchkarova | Girls' 50m Freestyle | DSQ | | Did not advance | | | |
| Yulduz Kuchkarova | Girls' 100m Backstroke | 1:04.63 | 11 Q | 1:04.03 | 8 Q | 1:04.46 | 8 |
| Yulduz Kuchkarova | Girls' 200m Backstroke | 2:18.69 | 17 | | | Did not advance | |

== Taekwondo ==
| Athlete | Event | Quarterfinal | Semifinal | Final | Rank |
|---|---|---|---|---|---|
| Abubakir Rasulov | Boys' −48kg | Mohammad Soleimani (IRI); L 1–5 | Did not advance | | 5 |

== Table Tennis ==
Individual

| Athlete | Event | Round 1 | | Round 2 | | Quarterfinals | Semifinals | Final | Rank |
| Athlete | Event | Group Matches | Rank | Group Matches | Rank | Quarterfinals | Semifinals | Final | Rank |
|---|---|---|---|---|---|---|---|---|---|
| Elmurod Holikov | Boys' Singles | Hageraats (NED); L 2–3 (10–12, 8–11, 11–7, 11–9, 4–11) | 4 qB | Mejia (ESA); W 3–0 (11–5, 11–8, 11–7) | 2 | Did not advance | | | 21 |
| Elmurod Holikov | Boys' Singles | Jouti (BRA); L 0–3 (9–11, 6–11, 1–11) | 4 qB | Das (IND); W 3–2 (11–7, 8–11, 11–2, 14–16, 11–8) | 2 | Did not advance | | | 21 |
| Elmurod Holikov | Boys' Singles | Gauzy (FRA); L 0–3 (4–11, 1–11, 5–11) | 4 qB | Gavilan (PAR); L 0–3 (8–11, 8–11, 9–11) | 2 | Did not advance | | | 21 |

Team

| Athlete | Event | Round 1 | | Round 2 | Quarterfinals | Semifinals | Final | Rank |
| Athlete | Event | Group Matches | Rank | Round 2 | Quarterfinals | Semifinals | Final | Rank |
|---|---|---|---|---|---|---|---|---|
| Intercontinental 2 Noskova (RUS); Elmurod Holikov (UZB) | Mixed Team | Singapore; Li (SIN); Chew (SIN); L 1–2 (3–2, 0–3, 1–3) | 3 qB | Africa 2 Ivoso (CGO); Kam (MRI); W 2–0 (3–0, 3–0) | Europe 5 Baravok (BLR); Bajger (CZE); L 0–2 (wd) | Did not advance | | 21 |
| Intercontinental 2 Noskova (RUS); Elmurod Holikov (UZB) | Mixed Team | Africa 1 Laid (ALG); Onaolapo (NGR); W 2–1 (3–0, 0–3, 3–0) | 3 qB | Africa 2 Ivoso (CGO); Kam (MRI); W 2–0 (3–0, 3–0) | Europe 5 Baravok (BLR); Bajger (CZE); L 0–2 (wd) | Did not advance | | 21 |
| Intercontinental 2 Noskova (RUS); Elmurod Holikov (UZB) | Mixed Team | Egypt; Meshref (EGY); Bedair (EGY); L 0–3 (2–3, 0–3, 1–3) | 3 qB | Africa 2 Ivoso (CGO); Kam (MRI); W 2–0 (3–0, 3–0) | Europe 5 Baravok (BLR); Bajger (CZE); L 0–2 (wd) | Did not advance | | 21 |

== Weightlifting ==
| Athlete | Event | Snatch | Clean & Jerk | Total | Rank |
|---|---|---|---|---|---|
| Ziyobitddin Kutbitddinov | Boys' 69 kg | 126 | 147 | 273 | 4 |
| Ganna Pustovarova | Girls' +63kg | 83 | 100 | 183 | 10 |

== Wrestling ==
Freestyle

| Athlete | Event | Pools | | Final | Rank |
| Athlete | Event | Groups | Rank | Final | Rank |
|---|---|---|---|---|---|
| Dierbek Ergashev | Boys' 76 kg | Kalayci (TUR); L 0–2 (0–2, 1–1+) | 2 | 3rd Place Match; Ali (EGY); W 2–0 (2–0, 1–0) | Bronze medal |
| Dierbek Ergashev | Boys' 76 kg | Hushtyn (BLR); W 2–0 (1+–1, 5–1) | 2 | 3rd Place Match; Ali (EGY); W 2–0 (2–0, 1–0) | Bronze medal |
| Dierbek Ergashev | Boys' 76 kg | Webb (CAN); W 2–0 (3–0, 6–0) | 2 | 3rd Place Match; Ali (EGY); W 2–0 (2–0, 1–0) | Bronze medal |
| Nilufar Gadaeva | Girls' 52 kg | Azzouz (ALG); W 2–0 (6–0, 4–0) | 2 | 3rd Place Match; Ngueyn (VIE); W Fall (3–0, 0–1, 4–0) | Bronze medal |
| Nilufar Gadaeva | Girls' 52 kg | Eustaquio (GUM); W Fall (4–0) | 2 | 3rd Place Match; Ngueyn (VIE); W Fall (3–0, 0–1, 4–0) | Bronze medal |
| Nilufar Gadaeva | Girls' 52 kg | Bagomedova (AZE); L Fall (0–3) | 2 | 3rd Place Match; Ngueyn (VIE); W Fall (3–0, 0–1, 4–0) | Bronze medal |

Greco-Roman

| Athlete | Event | Pools | | Final | Rank |
| Athlete | Event | Groups | Rank | Final | Rank |
|---|---|---|---|---|---|
| Nurbek Hakkulov | Boys' 50 kg | Sulaimanov (KGZ); W 2–0 (1–0, 3–0) | 1 | Mukhtarov (AZE); L 0–2 (0–3, 0–4) | DQ |
| Nurbek Hakkulov | Boys' 50 kg | Gundersen (NOR); W 2–0 (6–0, 6–0) | 1 | Mukhtarov (AZE); L 0–2 (0–3, 0–4) | DQ |
| Nurbek Hakkulov | Boys' 50 kg | Boughazi (ALG); W 2–0 (9–4, 4–2) | 1 | Mukhtarov (AZE); L 0–2 (0–3, 0–4) | DQ |
| Ruslan Kamilov | Boys' 85 kg | Petrosyan (ARM); W 2–0 (3–0, 6–0) | 2 | 3rd Place Match; Sheridan (USA); W 2–1 (5–0, 3–4, 2–0) | Bronze medal |
| Ruslan Kamilov | Boys' 85 kg | Choi (KOR); W 2–1 (6–0, 0–2, 1–0) | 2 | 3rd Place Match; Sheridan (USA); W 2–1 (5–0, 3–4, 2–0) | Bronze medal |
| Ruslan Kamilov | Boys' 85 kg | Adzhigov (RUS); L 0–2 (0–2, 1–3) | 2 | 3rd Place Match; Sheridan (USA); W 2–1 (5–0, 3–4, 2–0) | Bronze medal |
