= Andorra at the 2010 Summer Youth Olympics =

- IOC code: AND
- NOC: Andorran Olympic Committee
- Website: www.coa.ad

in Singapore
- Competitors: 4 in 3 sports
- Flag bearer: Monica Ramirez Abella
- Medals: Gold 0 Silver 0 Bronze 0 Total 0

Summer Youth Olympics appearances (overview)
- 2010; 2014; 2018

Andorra participated in the 2010 Summer Youth Olympics in Singapore.

The Andorran team consisted of 4 athletes competing in 3 sports: aquatics (swimming), athletics and judo.

== Medalists ==
| Medal | Name | Sport | Event | Date |
|---|---|---|---|---|
| Bronze | Patrik Ferreira Martins | Judo | Mixed Event | 25 Aug |

== Athletics ==
Note: The athletes who do not have a "Q" next to their Qualification Rank advance to a non-medal ranking final.

=== Girls ===
Track and road events

| Athletes | Event | Qualification | | Final | |
| Athletes | Event | Result | Rank | Result | Rank |
|---|---|---|---|---|---|
| Jenili Hilario Rodrigues | Girl's 400m | 1:06.91 | 23 qD | 1:06.63 | 21 |

== Judo ==
Individual

| Athlete | Event | Round 1 | Round 2 | Round 3 | Semifinals | Final | Rank |
| Athlete | Event | Opposition Result | Opposition Result | Opposition Result | Opposition Result | Opposition Result | Rank |
|---|---|---|---|---|---|---|---|
| Patrik Ferreira Martins | Boys' -66 kg | BYE | Jalilov (AZE); L 000-100 | Repechage; Asl (IRI); L 000-100 | Did not advance | | 13 |

Team

| Team | Event | Round 1 | Round 2 | Semifinals | Final | Rank |
| Team | Event | Opposition Result | Opposition Result | Opposition Result | Opposition Result | Rank |
|---|---|---|---|---|---|---|
| Tokyo; Seul Bi Bae (KOR); Fabio Basile (ITA); Gaelle Nemorin (MRI); Patrik Ferreira Martins (AND); Rotem Shor (ISR); Kevin Fernandez (HON); Kseniya Darchuk (UKR); Batuhan Efemgil (TUR) | Mixed Team | Paris; W 5-3 | New York; W 4-4 (3-2) | Belgrade; L 3-5 | Did not advance | Bronze medal |

== Swimming ==
| Athletes | Event | Heat | | Semifinal | | Final | |
| Athletes | Event | Time | Position | Time | Position | Time | Position |
|---|---|---|---|---|---|---|---|
| Oriol Cunat Rodriguez | Boys’ 200m Freestyle | 2:01.38 | 40 | | | Did not advance | |
| Oriol Cunat Rodriguez | Boys’ 50m Butterfly | 26.55 | 13 Q | 26.42 | 13 | Did not advance | |
| Monica Ramirez Abella | Girls’ 50m Backstroke | 30.80 | 11 Q | 30.82 | 11 | Did not advance | |
| Monica Ramirez Abella | Girls’ 100m Backstroke | 1:05.73 | 20 | Did not advance | | | |
