= Zambia at the 2010 Summer Youth Olympics =

- IOC code: ZAM
- NOC: National Olympic Committee of Zambia
- Website: www.nocz.co.zm

in Singapore
- Competitors: 4 in 4 sports
- Flag bearer: Ben Muziyo
- Medals: Gold 0 Silver 0 Bronze 0 Total 0

Summer Youth Olympics appearances
- 2010; 2014; 2018

Zambia competed at the 2010 Summer Youth Olympics, the inaugural Youth Olympic Games, held in Singapore from 14 August to 26 August 2010.

== Athletics ==
=== Boys ===
Track and Road Events

Athletes	Event	Qualification		Final	
Athletes	Event	Result	Rank	Result	Rank
Harry Mulenga	Boys’ 3000m	8:14.38	6 Q	8:11.26	5

== Badminton ==
Boys

Athlete	Event	Group Stage				Knock-Out Stage			
Athlete	Event	Match 1	Match 2	Match 3	Rank	Quarterfinal	Semifinal	Final	Rank
Ngosa Chongo	Boys’ Singles	Lam (USA) L 0-2 (15-21, 14-21)	Kang (KOR) L 0-2 (7-21, 9-21)	Castillo (MEX) L 0-2 (14-21, 10-21)	4	Did not advance			

== Boxing ==
Athlete	Event	Preliminaries	Semifinals	Final	Rank
Ben Muziyo	Welterweight (69 kg)	David Lourenço (BRA); L 2-6	Did not advance	5th Place Bout; Denis Radovan (GER); L 6-13	6

== Swimming ==
Athletes	Event	Heat		Semifinal		Final	
Athletes	Event	Time	Position	Time	Position	Time	Position
Mercedes Milner	Girls’ 50m Freestyle	28.93	42	Did not advance			
