= Liechtenstein at the 2010 Summer Youth Olympics =

- IOC code: LIE
- NOC: Liechtensteinischer Olympischer Sportverband
- Website: www.losv.li (in German and English)

in Singapore
- Competitors: 3 in 2 sports
- Flag bearer: Julia Hassler
- Medals: Gold 0 Silver 0 Bronze 0 Total 0

Summer Youth Olympics appearances
- 2010; 2014; 2018

Liechtenstein participated in the 2010 Summer Youth Olympics in Singapore.

The Liechtenstein squad consisted of 3 athletes competing in 2 sports: aquatics (swimming) and judo.

== Judo ==
Individual

Athlete	Event	Round 1	Round 2	Round 3	Semifinals	Final	Rank
Athlete	Event	Opposition Result	Opposition Result	Opposition Result	Opposition Result	Opposition Result	Rank
Patrick Marxer	Boys' -66 kg	BYE	Otgonbayar (MGL); L 000-102	Repechage; Tugushi (GEO); L 000-111	did not advance		13

Team

Team	Event	Round 1	Round 2	Semifinals	Final	Rank
Team	Event	Opposition Result	Opposition Result	Opposition Result	Opposition Result	Rank
Paris; Barbara Batizi (HUN); Patrick Marxer (LIE); Maja Rasinska (POL); Farshid Ghasemi Asl (IRI); Sophina Arrey (CMR); Khasan Khalmurzaev (RUS); Sana Khelifi (ALG); Fernando Vanoye (MEX)	Mixed Team	Tokyo; L 3-5	did not advance			9

== Swimming ==
Athletes	Event	Heat		Semifinal		Final	
Athletes	Event	Time	Position	Time	Position	Time	Position
Simon Beck	Boys’ 50m Breaststroke	31.36	12 Q	31.31	12	Did not advance	
Simon Beck	Boys’ 100m Breaststroke	1:08.42	26	Did not advance			
Julia Hassler	Girls’ 200m Freestyle	2:06.11	18			Did not advance	
Julia Hassler	Girls’ 400m Freestyle	4:18.59	6 Q			4:17.94	7
Julia Hassler	Girls’ 200m Butterfly	2:18.53	13			Did not advance	
