= Guam at the 2010 Summer Youth Olympics =

- IOC code: GUM
- NOC: Guam National Olympic Committee

in Singapore
- Competitors: 3 in 2 sports
- Flag bearer: Christopher Aguon
- Medals: Gold 0 Silver 0 Bronze 0 Total 0

Summer Youth Olympics appearances
- 2010; 2014; 2018

Guam competed at the 2010 Summer Youth Olympics, the inaugural Youth Olympic Games, held in Singapore from 14 August to 26 August 2010.

== Athletics ==
=== Boys ===
Track and road events

Athletes	Event	Qualification		Final	
Athletes	Event	Result	Rank	Result	Rank
Michael Gaitan	Boys' 400m	55.07	25 qD	55.20	24

== Wrestling ==
Freestyle

Athlete	Event	Pools		Final	Rank
Athlete	Event	Groups	Rank	Final	Rank
Christopher Aguon	Boys' 76kg	Rogers (USA); L T. Fall (0–7, 0–6)	4	7th Place Match; Webb (CAN); L Fall (0–4)	8
Christopher Aguon	Boys' 76kg	Ali (EGY); L T. Fall (0–7, 0–6)	4	7th Place Match; Webb (CAN); L Fall (0–4)	8
Christopher Aguon	Boys' 76kg	Kouagou (BEN); L Fall (0–7, 0–4)	4	7th Place Match; Webb (CAN); L Fall (0–4)	8
Arianna Eustaquio	Girls' 52kg	Azzouz (ALG); L 0–2 (0–1, 0–7)	4	7th Place Match; Lovik (NOR); L T. Fall (0–7, 0–6)	8
Arianna Eustaquio	Girls' 52kg	Gadaeva (UZB); L Fall (0–4)	4	7th Place Match; Lovik (NOR); L T. Fall (0–7, 0–6)	8
Arianna Eustaquio	Girls' 52kg	Bagomedova (AZE); L T. Fall (0–6, 0–7)	4	7th Place Match; Lovik (NOR); L T. Fall (0–7, 0–6)	8
