= Swimming at the 2010 Summer Youth Olympics – Girls' 400 metre freestyle =

The girls' 400 metre freestyle event at the 2010 Youth Olympic Games took place on August 20 at the Singapore Sports School.

== Medalists ==
Gold	Boglárka Kapás; Hungary	4:10.37
Silver	Kiera Janzen; United States	4:14.28
Bronze	Eleanor Faulkner; Great Britain	4:14.31

== Heats ==
=== Heat 1 ===
Rank	Lane	Name	Nationality	Time	Notes
1	3	Nesrine Khelifati	Tunisia	4:37.37	
2	4	Saskia Postma	Aruba	4:41.63	
3	5	Karlene van der Jagt	Suriname	4:45.03	

=== Heat 2 ===
Rank	Lane	Name	Nationality	Time	Notes
1	4	Stefania Pirozzi	Italy	4.18.36	Q
1	5	Kiera Janzen	United States	4.18.36	Q
3	3	Annick van Westendorp	Switzerland	4:20.17	
4	2	Simona Marinova	Macedonia	4:25.31	
5	7	Andrea Cedron	Peru	4:27.26	
6	6	Shahd Mostafa	Egypt	4:27.48	
7	8	Kaori Miyahara	Peru	4:29.27	
8	1	Marija Joksimović	Serbia	4:32.25	

=== Heat 3 ===
Rank	Lane	Name	Nationality	Time	Notes
1	4	Eleanor Faulkner	Great Britain	4:14.75	Q
2	5	Jordan Mattern	United States	4:19.51	Q
3	3	Anna Olasz	Hungary	4:19.71	Q
4	7	Inga Elin Cryer	Iceland	4:28.68	
5	1	Wei Li Lai	Malaysia	4:30.92	
6	6	Natasha de Vos	South Africa	4:33.68	
7	8	Shannon Austin	Seychelles	4:34.81	
8	2	Emma McKeon	Australia		DNS

=== Heat 4 ===
Rank	Lane	Name	Nationality	Time	Notes
1	4	Boglárka Kapás	Hungary	4:16.02	Q
2	3	Claudia Dasca	Spain	4:18.02	Q
3	7	Julia Hassler	Liechtenstein	4:18.59	Q
4	5	Chloe Francis	New Zealand	4:22.59	
5	6	Julia Gerotto	Brazil	4:23.71	
6	2	Lauren Earp	Canada	4:26.47	
7	8	Jurate Scerbinskaite	Lithuania	4:33.08	
8	1	Chriselle Koh	Singapore	4:34.28	

== Final ==
Rank	Lane	Name	Nationality	Time	Notes
1st place, gold medalist(s)	5	Boglárka Kapás	Hungary	4:10.37	
2nd place, silver medalist(s)	2	Kiera Janzen	United States	4:14.28	
3rd place, bronze medalist(s)	4	Eleanor Faulkner	Great Britain	4:14.31	
4	6	Stefanie Pirozzi	Italy	4:14.61	
5	3	Claudia Dasca	Spain	4:14.81	
6	1	Jordan Mattern	United States	4:14.94	
7	7	Julia Hassler	Liechtenstein	4:17.25	
8	8	Anna Olasz	Hungary	4:20.24	
