= Judo at the 2010 Summer Youth Olympics – Boys' 66 kg =

Judo competition

The Boys' 66 kg tournament in Judo at the 2010 Summer Youth Olympics was held on August 21 at the International Convention Centre.

This event was the second lightest of the boy's judo weight classes, limiting competitors to a maximum of 66 kilograms of body mass. The tournament bracket consisted of a single-elimination contest culminating in a gold medal match. There was also a repechage to determine the winners of the two bronze medals. Each judoka who had lost before the finals competed in the repechage with the two finalists getting bronze medals.

== Medalists ==
Gold	Maxamillian Schneider; United States
Silver	Song Chol Hyon; North Korea
Bronze	Phuc Cai; Denmark
Bronze	Davit Ghazaryan; Armenia

== Results ==
=== Main Bracket ===
Round of 32
Davit Ghazaryan (ARM)	110
Paolo Persoglia (SMR)	000
Kairat Agibayev (KAZ)	100
Beka Tugushi (GEO)	020

Round of 16
Maxamillian Schneider (USA)	022
Farshid Ghasemi Asl (IRI)	000
Jalil Jalilov (AZE)	100
Patrik Ferreira Martins (AND)	000
Phuc Cai (DEN)	011
Davit Ghazaryan (ARM)	021
Kęstutis Vitkauskas (LTU)	100
Jeremy Saywell (MLT)	000
Ioan Visan (ROU)	100
Matheus Garcia Machado (BRA)	000
Dulguun Otgonbayar (MGL)	102
Patrick Marxer (LIE)	000
Kairat Agibayev (KAZ)	100
Babacar Cisse (SEN)	000
Song Chol Hyon (PRK)	110
Brandon Arends (ARU)	000

Quarterfinals
Maxamillian Schneider (USA)	111
Jalil Jalilov (AZE)	000
Davit Ghazaryan (ARM)	001
Kęstutis Vitkauskas (LTU)	000
Ioan Visan (ROU)	000
Dulguun Otgonbayar (MGL)	001
Kairat Agibayev (KAZ)	000
Song Chol Hyon (PRK)	100

Semifinals
Maxamillian Schneider (USA)	101
Davit Ghazaryan (ARM)	000
Dulguun Otgonbayar (MGL)	000
Song Chol Hyon (PRK)	100

Finals
Maxamillian Schneider (USA)	100
Song Chol Hyon (PRK)	000

=== Repechage ===
Round 1
1	Paolo Persoglia (SMR)	000
2	Farshid Ghasemi Asl (IRI)	101

Round 1
1	Beka Tugushi (GEO)	100
2	Matheus Garcia Machado (BRA)	000

Round 2
Farshid Ghasemi Asl (IRI)	100
Patrik Ferreira Martins (AND)	000
Phuc Cai (DEN)	101
Jeremy Saywell (MLT)	000
Beka Tugushi (GEO)	111
Patrick Marxer (LIE)	000
Babacar Cisse (SEN)	100
Brandon Arends (ARU)	000

Second round
Farshid Ghasemi Asl (IRI)	012
Kęstutis Vitkauskas (LTU)	000
Phuc Cai (DEN)	010
Jalil Jalilov (AZE)	000
Beka Tugushi (GEO)	010
Kairat Agibayev (KAZ)	000
Babacar Cisse (SEN)	000
Ioan Visan (ROU)	100

Third round
Farshid Ghasemi Asl (IRI)	000
Phuc Cai (DEN)	100
Beka Tugushi (GEO)	100
Ioan Visan (ROU)	000

Bronze Medal Finals
Phuc Cai (DEN)	100
Dulguun Otgonbayar (MGL)	001
Beka Tugushi (GEO)	001
Davit Ghazaryan (ARM)	002
