= Brazil at the 2010 Summer Youth Olympics =

- IOC code: BRA
- NOC: Brazilian Olympic Committee
- Website: www.cob.org.br (in Portuguese)

in Singapore
- Competitors: 81 in 18 sports
- Flag bearer: Tiago Fernandes
- Medals Ranked 21st: Gold 2 Silver 3 Bronze 1 Total 6

Summer Youth Olympics appearances (overview)
- 2010; 2014; 2018

Brazil participated in the 2010 Summer Youth Olympics in Singapore.

The Brazilian squad consisted of 81 athletes competing in 18 sports: aquatics (diving, swimming), athletics, basketball, boxing, canoeing, cycling, equestrian, fencing, gymnastics, handball, judo, modern pentathlon, rowing, sailing, shooting, table tennis, tennis, and triathlon.

== Medalists ==
Medal	Name	Sport	Event	Date
Gold	Caio Cézar dos Santos	Athletics	Boys' long jump	22 Aug
Gold	Caio Cézar dos Santos	Athletics	Boys' medley relay (in Mixed-NOC Team)	23 Aug
Gold	David Lourenço	Boxing	Men's Welter 69kg	25 Aug
Silver	Flávia Gomes	Judo	Girls' −63kg	22 Aug
Silver	Thiago da Silva	Athletics	Boys' pole vault	23 Aug
Silver	Felipe Wu	Shooting	Boys' 10m air pistol	24 Aug
Bronze	Girls' Handball Team: Lais da Silva; Thayanne Lopes; Francielle da Rocha; Keila Alves; Juliana de Araujo; Fernanda Marques; Patricia Batista da Silva; Larissa Araújo; Isadora Garcia; Deborah Nunes; Ana Eduarda Vieira; Caroline Martins; Mirian Galvao; Daise Souza	Handball	Girls' tournament	25 Aug

== Athletics ==
=== Boys ===
Track and road events

Athletes	Event	Qualification		Final	
Athletes	Event	Result	Rank	Result	Rank
Antônio Rodrigues	Boys' 200m	21.70	3 Q	21.60	8
Leandro de Araújo	Boys' 400m	48.23	8 Q	47.59	5
Joseilton Cunha	Boys' 1000m	2:25.49	9 Q	2:24.14	5
Jean da Silva	Boys' 110m hurdles	14.13	10 qB	13.76	8
Ioran Etchechury	Boys' 2000m steeplechase	6:39.87	12 qB	DNS	
Caio dos Santos (BRA); Odean Skeen (JAM); Najee Glass (USA); Luguelín Santos (DOM)	Boys' medley relay			1:51.38	Gold medal

Field events

Athletes	Event	Qualification		Final	
Athletes	Event	Result	Rank	Result	Rank
Caio dos Santos	Boys' long jump	7.66	1 Q	7.69	Gold medal
Paulo Sérgio Oliveira	Boys' triple jump	15.44	3 Q	15.63	5
Felipe Hickmann	Boys' high jump	1.90	14 qB	1.90	14
Thiago da Silva	Boys' pole vault	4.60	8 Q	5.05	Silver medal

=== Girls ===
Track and road events

Athletes	Event	Qualification		Final	
Athletes	Event	Result	Rank	Result	Rank
Jessica dos Reis	Girls' 100m	11.95	7 Q	11.94	6
Tamara de Sousa	Girls' 100m hurdles	14.29	12 qB	14.12	12
Natania Habitzreiter	Girls' 400m hurdles	1:01.46	8 Q	1:02.44	8
July da Silva	Girls' 2000m steeplechase	7:01.84	6 Q	6:56.00	6

Field events

Athletes	Event	Qualification		Final	
Athletes	Event	Result	Rank	Result	Rank
Saionara Pavanatto	Girls' shot put	11.90	14 qB	11.92	14
Andressa Fidelis	Girls' long jump	5.85	9 qB	5.45	13

== Basketball ==
Girls

Squad list	Event	Group stage		Placement stage			Rank
Squad list	Event	Group C	Rank	1st–8th	5th–8th	5th–6th	Rank
Stephanie de Oliveira; Erika Leite (C); Isabela Macedo; Joice Coelho	Girls' basketball	Czech Republic; W 30–26	2 Q	Australia; L 20–23	South Korea; W 28–13	Japan; L 29–32	6
Stephanie de Oliveira; Erika Leite (C); Isabela Macedo; Joice Coelho	Girls' basketball	Thailand; W 31–9	2 Q	Australia; L 20–23	South Korea; W 28–13	Japan; L 29–32	6
Stephanie de Oliveira; Erika Leite (C); Isabela Macedo; Joice Coelho	Girls' basketball	China; L 24–28	2 Q	Australia; L 20–23	South Korea; W 28–13	Japan; L 29–32	6
Stephanie de Oliveira; Erika Leite (C); Isabela Macedo; Joice Coelho	Girls' basketball	Mali; W 34–14	2 Q	Australia; L 20–23	South Korea; W 28–13	Japan; L 29–32	6

== Boxing ==
Boys

Athlete	Event	Preliminaries	Semifinals	Final	Rank
David Lourenco	Welterweight (69kg)	Ben Muziyo (ZAM); W 6–2	Islomzhon Pazziyev (KGZ); W 2–1	Ahmed Mamadjanov (UZB); W 7–3	Gold medal

== Canoeing ==
Boys

Athlete	Event	Time trial		Round 1	Round 2 (Rep)	Round 3	Round 4	Round 5	Final
Athlete	Event	Time	Rank	Round 1	Round 2 (Rep)	Round 3	Round 4	Round 5	Final
Isaquias Queiroz	Boys' C1 slalom	1:51.20	5	Liferi (ROU); W 1:53.23-2:01.73		Burisa (CRO); W 1:51.66-1:58.64	Daniels (CAN); L DNF-1:47.60	Did not advance	
Isaquias Queiroz	Boys' C1 sprint	1:41.53	1	BYE		Babayan (ARM); W 1:44.89-2:22.29	Castaneda (MEX); L 1:53.21-1:49.74	Did not advance	

== Cycling ==
Cross country

Athlete	Event	Time	Rank	Points
William Alexi	Boys' cross country	1:04:17	16	70
Mayara Perez	Girls' cross country	-3LAP	29	40

Time trial

Athlete	Event	Time	Rank	Points
Guilherme Pineyrua	Boys' time trial	4:24.03	24	30
Mayara Perez	Girls' time trial	3:52.18	27	40

BMX

Athlete	Event	Seeding round		Quarterfinals							Semifinals							Final		
Athlete	Event	Seeding round		Run 1		Run 2		Run 3		Rank	Run 1		Run 2		Run 3		Rank	Final		
Athlete	Event	Time	Rank	Time	Rank	Time	Rank	Time	Rank	Rank	Time	Rank	Time	Rank	Time	Rank	Rank	Time	Rank	Points
Leandro Miranda	Boys' BMX	33.502	15	45.018	3	34.385	3	32.779	3	3 Q	32.554	4	41.117	4	47.069	5	3 Q	32.818	7	40
Mayara Perez	Girls' BMX	36.593	1	39.039	1	40.810	1	38.601	1	1 Q	36.818	1	37.270	1	38.800	3	1 Q	35.698	1	1

Road race

Athlete	Event	Time	Rank	Points
William Alexi	Boys' road race	1:05:44	37	72
Leandro Miranda	Boys' road race	1:16:48	62	
Guilherme Pineyrua	Boys' road race	DNF		

Overall

Team	Event	Cross country pts		Time trial pts		BMX pts		Road race Pts	Total	Rank
Team	Event	Boys	Girls	Boys	Girls	Boys	Girls	Road race Pts	Total	Rank
Mayara Perez; William Alexi; Guilherme Pineyrua; Leandro Miranda	Mixed team	70	40	30	40	40	1	72	293	13

== Diving ==
Boys

Athlete	Event	Preliminary		Final	
Athlete	Event	Points	Rank	Points	Rank
Pedro Abreu	Boys' 3m springboard	366.85	14	Did not advance	

Girls

Athlete	Event	Preliminary		Final	
Athlete	Event	Points	Rank	Points	Rank
Nicoli Cruz	Girls' 10m platform	313.85	11 Q	322.10	11

== Equestrian ==
Athlete	Horse	Event	Round 1			Round 2			Total	Jump-Off		Rank
Athlete	Horse	Event	Penalties		Rank	Penalties		Rank	Total	Penalties	Time	Rank
Athlete	Horse	Event	Jump	Time	Rank	Jump	Time	Rank	Total	Penalties	Time	Rank
Guilherme Foroni	The Hec Man	Individual jumping	0	0	1	8	0	19	8			9
Guilherme Foroni (BRA); Maria Victoria Paz (ARG); Alberto Schwalm (CHI); Mario Gamboa (COL); Marcelo Chirico (URU)	The Hec Man; Glen Haven Accolade; Stoneleigh Eddie; LH Titan; Links Hot Gossip	Team jumping	~~16~~; ~~12~~; 8; 4; 0	~~0~~; ~~0~~; 0; 0; 0	4	0; ~~16~~; ~~16~~; 0; 4	0; ~~0~~; ~~0~~; 0; 0	2	16			5

== Fencing ==
Group stage

Athlete	Event	Match 1	Match 2	Match 3	Match 4	Match 5	Seed
Guilherme Melaragno	Boys' épée	Svichkar (UKR); W 5–4	Zhakupov (KAZ); L 4–5	Fichera (ITA); L 2–5	Kruk (POL); L 4–5	Saleh (EGY); L 4–5	10

Knock-out stage

Athlete	Event	Round of 16	Quarterfinals	Semifinals	Final	Rank
Guilherme Melaragno	Boys' épée	Kruk (POL); L 13–15	Did not advance			11
Americas 2 Maria Carreno (VEN); Guilherme Melaragno (BRA); Mona Shaito (USA); Miguel Breault-Mallette (CAN); Clara Isabel Di Tella (ARG); Redys Prades Rosabal (CUB)	Mixed team	Africa; W 28–25	Europe 1 L 17–30	5th–8th Europe 3 L 23–30	7th–8th Asia-Oceania 2 W 28–27	7

== Gymnastics ==
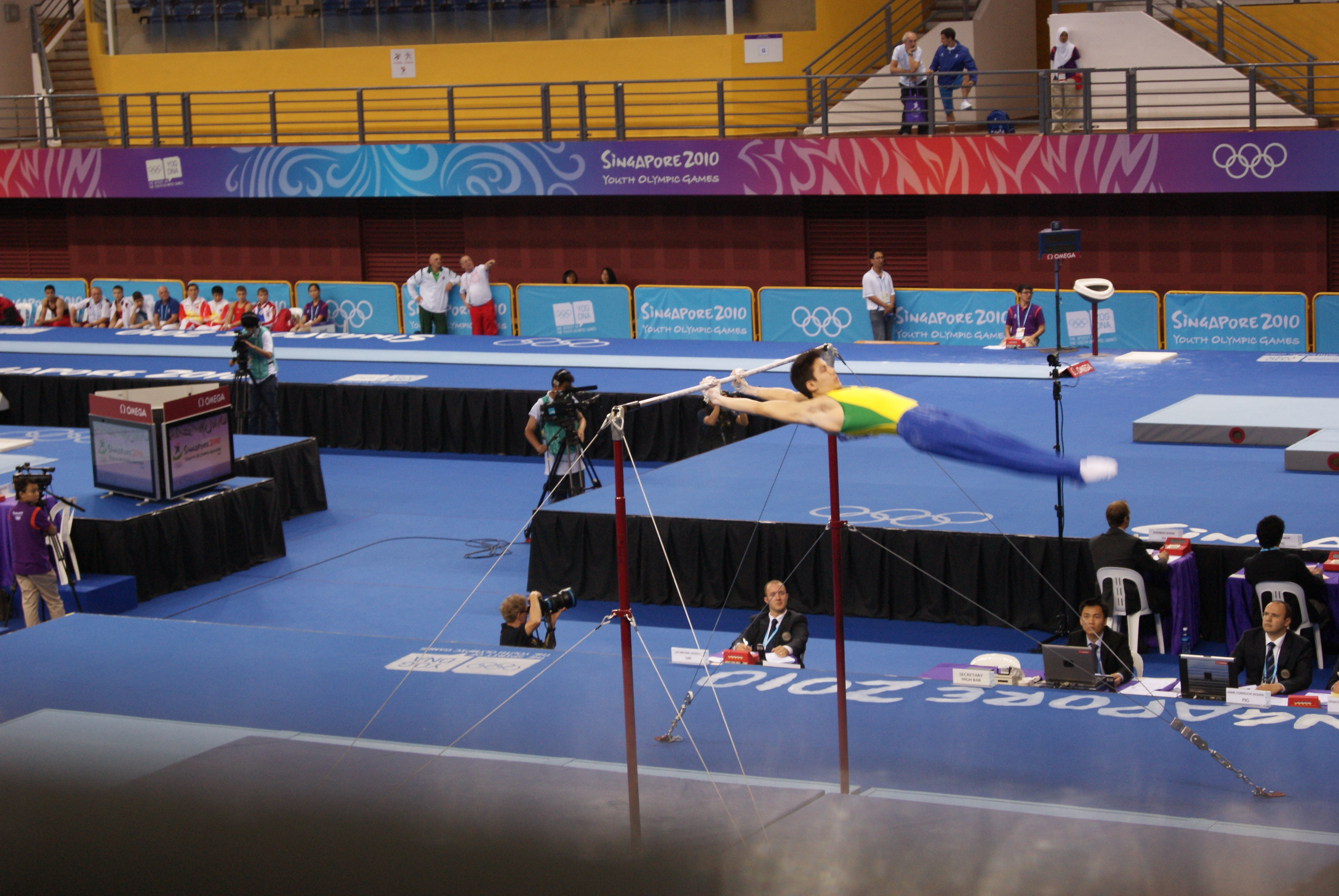
Arthur Mariano performing on the horizontal bar during the artistic gymnastics competition on 16 August 2010 at Bishan Sports Hall, Singapore

=== Artistic gymnastics ===
Boys

Athlete	Event	Floor		Pommel Horse		Rings		Vault		Parallel bars		Horizontal bar		Total	
Athlete	Event	Score	Rank	Score	Rank	Score	Rank	Score	Rank	Score	Rank	Score	Rank	Score	Rank
Arthur Mariano	Boys' qualification	13.500	22	13.150	18	11.950	37	15.350	17 Q	13.450	16	13.250	20	80.650	21

Athlete	Event	Score	Rank
Arthur Mariano	Boys' vault	15.400	4

Girls

Athlete	Event	Vault		Uneven bars		Beam		Floor		Total	
Athlete	Event	Score	Rank	Score	Rank	Score	Rank	Score	Rank	Score	Rank
Harumy Freitas	Girls' qualification	13.550	13 Q	12.700	12	13.750	6 Q	13.100	9	53.100	11 Q
Harumy Freitas	Girls' Individual all-around	13.850	5	11.800	14	13.450	8	13.150	9	52.250	11

Athlete	Event	Score	Rank
Harumy Freitas	Girls' vault	13.425	6
Harumy Freitas	Girls' Beam	13.450	5

=== Trampoline ===
Athlete	Event	Qualification				Final	
Athlete	Event	Routine 1	Routine 2	Total	Rank	Routine 1	Rank
Daienne Lima	Girls' trampoline	23.800	34.800	58.600	6 Q	26.400	8

== Handball ==
Boys

Squad list	Event	Group stage		Semifinal	3rd place match	Rank
Squad list	Event	Group B	Rank	Semifinal	3rd place match	Rank
Matheus Dias; Daniel Luz; Leonardo de Oliveira; Fulvio Volpe; Fernando Dutra; Matheus Francisco; Filipe Rocha; Roney Franzini; Andre de Sousa; Arthur Malburg; Ricardo Assef; Andre Leal; Rodolfo Oliveira; Victor Campos	Boys' handball	Singapore; W 53–7	1 Q	South Korea; L 22–27	France; L 27–40	4
Matheus Dias; Daniel Luz; Leonardo de Oliveira; Fulvio Volpe; Fernando Dutra; Matheus Francisco; Filipe Rocha; Roney Franzini; Andre de Sousa; Arthur Malburg; Ricardo Assef; Andre Leal; Rodolfo Oliveira; Victor Campos	Boys' handball	Egypt; D 31–31	1 Q	South Korea; L 22–27	France; L 27–40	4

Girls

Squad list	Event	Group stage		Semifinal	3rd place match	Rank
Squad list	Event	Group A	Rank	Semifinal	3rd place match	Rank
Lais da Silva; Thayanne Lopes; Francielle da Rocha; Keila Alves; Juliana de Araujo; Fernanda Marques; Patricia da Silva; Larissa Araujo; Isadora Garcia; Deborah Nunes; Ana Eduarda Vieira; Caroline Martins; Mirian Galvao; Daise Souza	Girls' Handball	Russia; L 20–35	2 Q	Denmark; L 25–30	Kazakhstan; W 45–23	Bronze medal
Lais da Silva; Thayanne Lopes; Francielle da Rocha; Keila Alves; Juliana de Araujo; Fernanda Marques; Patricia da Silva; Larissa Araujo; Isadora Garcia; Deborah Nunes; Ana Eduarda Vieira; Caroline Martins; Mirian Galvao; Daise Souza	Girls' Handball	Angola; W 30–27	2 Q	Denmark; L 25–30	Kazakhstan; W 45–23	Bronze medal

== Judo ==
Individual

Athlete	Event	Round 1	Round 2	Round 3	Semifinals	Final	Rank
Athlete	Event	Opposition Result	Opposition Result	Opposition Result	Opposition Result	Opposition Result	Rank
Matheus Marcia Machado	Boys' −66 kg	BYE	Visan (ROU); L 000–100	Repechage; Tugushi (GEO); L 000–100	Did not advance		17
Flavia Gomes	Girls' −63 kg	BYE	Kapeko (BOT); W 110–000	Beridze (GEO); W 112–000	Naginskaitė (LTU); W 002–000	Tashiro (JPN); L 000–100	Silver medal

Team

Team	Event	Round 1	Round 2	Semifinals	Final	Rank
Team	Event	Opposition Result	Opposition Result	Opposition Result	Opposition Result	Rank
New York; Katelyn Bouyssou (USA); Dmytro Atanov (UKR); Julanda Bacaj (ALB); Matheus Marcia Machado (BRA); Dilara Incedayi (TUR); Ghenadie Pretivatii (MDA); Milica Savic (BIH); Mateja Glusac (SRB)	Mixed team	BYE	Tokyo; L 4–4 (2–3)	Did not advance		5

== Modern pentathlon ==
Athlete	Event	Fencing (épée One Touch)			Swimming (200m freestyle)			Running & Shooting (3000m, Laser Pistol)			Total Points	Final Rank
Athlete	Event	Results	Rank	Points	Time	Rank	Points	Time	Rank	Points	Total Points	Final Rank
William Muinhos	Boys' Individual	7–16	21	640	2:09.97	11	1244	11:34.93	13	2224	4108	17
Mariana Laporte	Girls' Individual	9–14	14	720	2:25.60	12	1056	15:03.67	24	1388	3164	24
Manon Carpentier (FRA); William Muinhos (BRA)	Mixed relay	35–57	22	710	2:06.88	14	1280	16:17.28	13	2172	4162	17
Mariana Laporte (BRA); Jan Szalay (SVK)	Mixed relay	45–47	13	810	2:07.62	15	1272	19:56.98	24	1296	3378	24

== Rowing ==
Athlete	Event	Heats		Repechage		Semifinals		Final		Overall Rank
Athlete	Event	Time	Rank	Time	Rank	Time	Rank	Time	Rank	Overall Rank
Tiago Braga	Boys' Single Sculls	3:26.01	2 QR	3:34.62	1 QA/B	3:30.52	3 QA	3:27.73	5	5

== Sailing ==
One Person Dinghy

Athlete	Event	Race												Points	Rank
Athlete	Event	1	2	3	4	5	6	7	8	9	10	11	M*	Points	Rank
Alexander Elstrodt	Boys' Byte CII	~~24~~	11	10	6	18	17	5	23	4	~~24~~	17	16	127	17
Claudia Mazzaferro	Girls' Byte CII	21	6	3	3	10	4	12	~~21~~	3	~~OCS~~	13	6	81	6

Windsurfing

Athlete	Event	Race											Points	Rank
Athlete	Event	1	2	3	4	5	6	7	8	9	10	M*	Points	Rank
Wendy Richer Soares	Girls' Techno 293	15	15	~~17~~	13	13	9	16	12	16	10	18	137	14

== Shooting ==
Pistol

Athlete	Event	Qualification		Final		
Athlete	Event	Score	Rank	Score	Total	Rank
Felipe Wu	Boys' 10m air pistol	576	2 Q	100.0	676.0	Silver medal

== Swimming ==
Boys

Athletes	Event	Heat		Semifinal		Final	
Athletes	Event	Time	Position	Time	Position	Time	Position
Pedro Antonio Costa	Boys' 50m backstroke			27.04	8 Q	27.16	8
Pedro Antonio Costa	Boys' 100m backstroke	59.46	22	Did not advance			
Pedro Antonio Costa	Boys' 50m butterfly	24.98	3 Q	25.02	6 Q	24.81	4
Pedro Henrique Franca de Souza	Boys' 200m freestyle	1:57.97	33	Did not advance			
Victor Rodrigues	Boys' 50m freestyle	24.27	24	Did not advance			
Victor Rodrigues	Boys' 100m freestyle	51.92	16 Q	52.07	15	Did not advance	
Victor Rodrigues	Boys' 200m freestyle	1:52.99	13			Did not advance	
Victor Rodrigues	Boys' 400m freestyle	4:01.56	11			Did not advance	
Vinicius Borges	Boys' 50m breaststroke	29.73	8 Q	29.75	9	Did not advance	
Vinicius Borges	Boys' 100m breaststroke	1:07.78	24	Did not advance			
Victor Rodrigues; Pedro Antonio Costa; Pedro Henrique Franca de Souza; Vinicius Borges	Boys' 4 × 100 m freestyle relay	3:32.64	11			Did not advance	
Victor Rodrigues; Pedro Antonio Costa; Pedro Henrique Franca de Souza; Vinicius Borges	Boys' 4 × 100 m medley relay	DNS				Did not advance	

Girls

Athletes	Event	Heat		Semifinal		Final	
Athletes	Event	Time	Position	Time	Position	Time	Position
Alessandra Marchioro	Girls' 50m freestyle	26.34	4 Q	25.85	4 Q	25.92	4
Alessandra Marchioro	Girls' 100m freestyle	56.74	2 Q	56.82	5 Q	57.12	5
Alessandra Marchioro	Girls' 50m breaststroke	32.65	2 Q	32.70	4 Q	32.60	4
Bruna Rocha	Girls' 50m butterfly	28.23	9 Q	28.09	9	Did not advance	
Bruna Rocha	Girls' 100m butterfly	1:03.07	20	Did not advance			
Carolina Bergamaschi	Girls' 50m freestyle	26.35	5 Q	26.13	5 Q	26.24	7
Carolina Bergamaschi	Girls' 100m breaststroke	1:16.42	27	Did not advance			
Julia Gerotto	Girls' 400m freestyle	4:23.71	11			Did not advance	
Julia Gerotto	Girls' 200m backstroke	2:23.75	25			Did not advance	
Julia Gerotto	Girls' 200m butterfly	2:14.61	5 Q			2:13.74	5
Julia Gerotto	Girls' 200m individual medley	2:21.90	10			Did not advance	
Alessandra Marchioro; Carolina Bergamaschi; Bruna Rocha; Julia Gerotto	Girls' 4x100 freestyle relay	3:54.87	5 Q			3:52.86	5
Alessandra Marchioro; Carolina Bergamaschi; Bruna Rocha; Julia Gerotto	Girls' 4x100 medley relay	4:25.66	8 Q			4:24.62	7

Mixed

Athletes	Event	Heat		Semifinal		Final	
Athletes	Event	Time	Position	Time	Position	Time	Position
Victor Rodrigues; Alessandra Marchioro; Carolina Bergamaschi; Pedro Henrique Franca de Souza	Mixed 4x100 Freestyle relay	3:41.07	9			Did not advance	
Pedro Antonio Costa; Vinicius Borges; Bruna Rocha; Julia Gerotto	Mixed 4x100 medley relay	4:08.25	11			Did not advance	

== Table tennis ==
Individual

Athlete	Event	Round 1		Round 2		Quarterfinals	Semifinals	Final	Rank
Athlete	Event	Group matches	Rank	Group matches	Rank	Quarterfinals	Semifinals	Final	Rank
Eric Jouti	Boys' singles	Gauzy (FRA); L 0–3 (13–15, 2–11, 4–11)	3 qB	Saragovi (ARG); W 3–0 (11–4, 11–7, 11–6)	2	Did not advance			21
Eric Jouti	Boys' singles	Holikov (UZB); W 3–0 (11–9, 11–6, 11–1)	3 qB	Hmam (TUN); L 2–3 (8–11, 11–7, 9–11, 11–4, 7–11)	2	Did not advance			21
Eric Jouti	Boys' singles	Hageraats (NED); L 2–3 (7–11, 11–9, 9–11, 11–9, 5–11)	3 qB	Tapia (ECU); W 3–0 (11–4, 11–3, 11–8)	2	Did not advance			21
Caroline Kumahara	Girls' singles	Rosheuvel (GUY); W 3–0 (11–3, 11–2, 11–6)	2 Q	Eerland (NED); L 0–3 (9–11, 8–11, 5–11)	4	Did not advance			13
Caroline Kumahara	Girls' singles	Noskova (RUS); L 0–3 (10–12, 7–11, 9–11)	2 Q	Bliznet (MDA); L 0–3 (8–11, 8–11, 6–11)	4	Did not advance			13
Caroline Kumahara	Girls' singles	Huang (TPE); W 3–0 (11–9, 11–8, 11–6)	2 Q	Sawettabut (THA); L 0–3 (7–11, 9–11, 3–11)	4	Did not advance			13

Team

Athlete	Event	Round 1		Round 2	Quarterfinals	Semifinals	Final	Rank
Athlete	Event	Group matches	Rank	Round 2	Quarterfinals	Semifinals	Final	Rank
Brazil; Caroline Kumahara (BRA); Eric Jouti (BRA)	Mixed team	Japan; Tanioka (JPN); Niwa (JPN); L 0–3 (0–3, 0–3, 0–3)	2 Q	Europe 1 Szocs (ROU); Soderlund (SWE); L 0–2 (1–3, 1–3)	Did not advance			9
Brazil; Caroline Kumahara (BRA); Eric Jouti (BRA)	Mixed team	BYE	2 Q	Europe 1 Szocs (ROU); Soderlund (SWE); L 0–2 (1–3, 1–3)	Did not advance			9
Brazil; Caroline Kumahara (BRA); Eric Jouti (BRA)	Mixed team	Pan America 1 Hsing (USA); Gavilan (PAR); W 2–1 (3–1, 1–3, 3–2)	2 Q	Europe 1 Szocs (ROU); Soderlund (SWE); L 0–2 (1–3, 1–3)	Did not advance			9

== Tennis ==
singles

Athlete	Event	Round 1	Round 2	Quarterfinals	Semifinals	Final	Rank
Tiago Fernandes	Boys' singles	Heller (GER); W 2–1 (6–1, 5–7, 6–4)	Kovalík (SVK); W 2–0 (7–6, 6–1)	Baluda (RUS); L 0–2 (2–6, 6–7)	Did not advance		

doubles

Athlete	Event	Round 1	Quarterfinals	Semifinals	Final	Rank
Tiago Fernandes (BRA); Renzo Olivo (ARG)	Boys' doubles	Heller (GER); Krawietz (GER); W 2–0 (6–3, 7–5)	Galeano (PAR); Rodriguez (VEN); L 0–2 (4–6, 4–6)	Did not advance		

== Triathlon ==
Boys

Athlete	Event	Swim (1.5 km)	Trans 1	Bike (40 km)	Trans 2	Run (10 km)	Total	Rank
Iuri Venuto	Individual	9:30	0:28	30:22	0:20	17:27	58:07.96	22

Mixed

Athlete	Event	Total times per athlete (swim 250 m, bike 7 km, run 1.7 km)	Total group time	Rank
Jessica Piedra (ECU); Carlos Perez (VEN); Leslie Amat Alvarez (CUB); Iuri Vinuto (BRA)	Mixed team relay Americas 3	22:30; 19:53; 23:32; 20:39	1:26:34.25	11
