= Swimming at the 2010 Summer Youth Olympics – Girls' 200 metre freestyle =

The girls' 200 metre freestyle event at the 2010 Youth Olympic Games took place on August 18 and the final on August 19, at the Singapore Sports School.

== Medalists ==
Gold	Tang Yi; China	1:58.78
Silver	Boglárka Kapás; Hungary	2:00.99
Bronze	Emma McKeon; Australia	2:01.18

== Heats ==
=== Heat 1 ===
Rank	Lane	Name	Nationality	Time	Notes
1	5	Zeineb Khalfallah	Tunisia	2:05.56	
2	3	Adeline Mei-Li Tin Hon Ko	Mauritius	2:21.73	
3	4	Fabiola Espinoza	Nicaragua	2:24.21	

=== Heat 2 ===
Rank	Lane	Name	Nationality	Time	Notes
1	6	Andrea Cedron	Peru	2:09.59	
2	4	Shannon Austin	Seychelles	2:10.54	
3	2	Maria Lopez Nery Huerta	Paraguay	2:11.60	
4	5	Kimberlee John-Williams	Trinidad and Tobago	2:11.92	
5	3	Adeline Winata	Singapore	2:12.69	
6	7	Saskia Postma	Aruba	2:13.64	
7	1	Tieri Erasito	Fiji	2:21.80	

=== Heat 3 ===
Rank	Lane	Name	Nationality	Time	Notes
1	8	Julia Hassler	Liechtenstein	2:06.11	
2	4	Ekaterina Andreeva	Russia	2:06.37	
3	1	Jurate Scerbinskaite	Lithuania	2:07.97	
4	5	Aksana Dziamidava	Belarus	2:07.98	
5	7	Kaori Miyahara	Peru	2:09.15	
6	3	Simona Marinova	Macedonia	2:09.55	
7	6	Karen Sif ViljalmsdottIr	Iceland	2:01.61	
8	2	Wei Li Lai	Malaysia	2:09.66	

=== Heat 4 ===
Rank	Lane	Name	Nationality	Time	Notes
1	4	Eleanor Faulkner	Great Britain	2:04.44	
2	8	Lotta Nevalainen	Switzerland	2:04.59	
3	6	Amanda Lim	Singapore	2:04.68	
4	5	Agnes Bucz	Hungary	2:05.90	
5	1	Lauren Earp	Canada	2:06.10	
6	3	Juanita Barreto	Colombia	2:10.35	
7	2	Kyla Ferreira	South Africa	2:11.21	
	7	Sarah Wegria	Belgium		DNS

=== Heat 5 ===
Rank	Lane	Name	Nationality	Time	Notes
1	3	Kiera Janzen	United States	2:02.09	Q
2	6	Jordan Mattern	United States	2:02.91	Q
3	7	Danielle Villars	Switzerland	2:03.56	Q
4	4	Emma McKeon	Australia	2:03.78	Q
5	4	Chloe Francis	New Zealand	2:03.92	Q
6	1	Jasmine Alkhaldi	Philippines	2:07.37	
7	2	Katarina Listopadova	Slovakia	2:07.63	
8	8	Tam Nguyen Tran	Vietnam	2:07.93	

=== Heat 6 ===
Rank	Lane	Name	Nationality	Time	Notes
1	4	Tang Yi	China	2:02.48	Q
2	5	Boglárka Kapás	Hungary	2:02.84	Q
3	3	Juliane Reinhold	Germany	2:04.09	Q
4	6	Claudia Dasca	Spain	2:04.54	
5	7	Gizem Bozkurt	Turkey	2:04.55	
6	2	Natalia Pawlaczek	Poland	2:05.76	
7	8	Katarina Simonović	Serbia	2:06.13	
8	1	Shahd Mostafa	Egypt	2:07.33	

== Final ==
Rank	Lane	Name	Nationality	Time	Notes
1st place, gold medalist(s)	5	Tang Yi	China	1:58.78	
2nd place, silver medalist(s)	3	Boglárka Kapás	Hungary	2:00.99	
3rd place, bronze medalist(s)	7	Emma McKeon	Australia	2:01.18	
4	4	Kiera Janzen	United States	2:02.01	
5	8	Juliane Reinhold	Germany	2:02.83	
6	1	Chloe Francis	New Zealand	2:03.18	
7	6	Jordan Mettern	United States	2:03.28	
8	2	Danielle Villars	Switzerland	2:04.89	
