= Belarus at the 2010 Summer Youth Olympics =

- IOC code: BLR
- NOC: Belarus Olympic Committee
- Website: www.noc.by

in Singapore
- Competitors: 49 in 19 sports
- Flag bearer: Aliaksandr Venskel
- Medals Ranked 59th: Gold 0 Silver 4 Bronze 1 Total 5

Summer Youth Olympics appearances (overview)
- 2010; 2014; 2018

Belarus participated in the 2010 Summer Youth Olympics in Singapore.

The Belarusian squad consisted of 50 athletes competing in 19 sports: aquatics (swimming), archery, athletics, basketball, boxing, canoeing, cycling, fencing, gymnastics, judo, modern pentathlon, rowing, sailing, shooting, table tennis, taekwondo, tennis, weightlifting and wrestling.

== Medalists ==
Medal	Name	Sport	Event	Date
Gold	Anton Karoukin	Archery	Mixed team	19 Aug
Silver	Sviatlana Makshtarova	Gymnastics	Girls' trampoline	20 Aug
Silver	Illia Charheika	Shooting	Boys' 10m air rifle	22 Aug
Silver	Alena Navahrodskaya	Athletics	Girls' hammer throw	23 Aug
Silver	Arina Charopa	Gymnastics	Girls' rhythmic all-around	25 Aug
Bronze	Vita Valnova	Judo	Girls' 44kg	21 Aug

== Archery ==
Boys

Athlete	Event	Ranking round		Round of 32	Round of 16	Quarterfinals	Semifinals	Final	
Athlete	Event	Score	Seed	Opposition Score	Opposition Score	Opposition Score	Opposition Score	Opposition Score	Rank
Anton Karoukin	Boys' individual	591	23	Sabry (EGY); L 5-6	Did not advance				17

Girls

Athlete	Event	Ranking round		Round of 32	Round of 16	Quarterfinals	Semifinals	Final	
Athlete	Event	Score	Seed	Opposition Score	Opposition Score	Opposition Score	Opposition Score	Opposition Score	Rank
Iryna Hul	Girls' individual	554	25	Mirca (MDA); L 1-7	Did not advance				17

Mixed team

Athlete	Event	Partner	Round of 32	Round of 16	Quarterfinals	Semifinals	Final	
Athlete	Event	Partner	Opposition Score	Opposition Score	Opposition Score	Opposition Score	Opposition Score	Rank
Anton Karoukin	Mixed team	Gloria Filippi (ITA)	Kwak (KOR)/ Gyi (MYA); W 6-0	Mirca (MDA)/ Ipsen (DEN); W 6-4	Hul (BLR)/ Luo (CHN); W 6-2	Unsal (TUR)/ Jaffar (SIN); W 6-0	Paraskevpoulou (GRE)/ Rajh (SLO); W 7-3	Gold medal
Iryna Hul	Mixed team	Siyue Luo (CHN)	Gobbels (BEL)/ Hajduk (CZE); W 6-2	Sorsa (FIN)/ Tsybzhitov (RUS); W 6-5	Filippi (ITA)/ Karoukin (BLR); L 2-6	Did not advance		8

== Athletics ==
=== Boys ===
Track and road events

Athletes	Event	Qualification		Final	
Athletes	Event	Result	Rank	Result	Rank
Yauhen Zaleski	Boys' 10km walk			46:52.38	8

Field events

Athletes	Event	Qualification		Final	
Athletes	Event	Result	Rank	Result	Rank
Yauhen Rabtsevich	Boys' triple jump	14.50	11 qB	14.06	13
Andrei Churyla	Boys' high jump	2.07	7 Q	2.14	4

=== Girls ===
Track and road events

Athletes	Event	Qualification		Final	
Athletes	Event	Result	Rank	Result	Rank
Nina Savina	Girls' 3000m	9:48.45	7 Q	9:50.04	6
Anastasiya Puzakova	Girls' 2000m Steeplechase	7:03.02	7 Q	7:55.18	7
Volha Dukhounik	Girls' 5km walk			25:09.48	12

Field events

Athletes	Event	Qualification		Final	
Athletes	Event	Result	Rank	Result	Rank
Viktoryia Kolb	Girls' shot put	13.61	8 Q	14.61	6
Volha Hladchanka	Girls' discus throw	41.44	11 qB	39.85	11
Alena Navahrodskaya	Girls' hammer throw	59.39	1 Q	57.34	Silver medal
Iryna Yakaltsevich	Girls' pole vault	3.50	12 qB	3.90	9

== Basketball ==
Girls

Squad list	Event	Group stage		Placement stage			Rank
Squad list	Event	Group B	Rank	9th-16th	9th-12th	11th-12th	Rank
Katsiaryna Nialepka; Nadzeya Bohdan (C); Darya Lipinskaya; Natallia Baklaha	Girls' basketball	Angola; W 35-11	3	Ivory Coast; W 33-7	Italy; L 28-29	Russia; L 18-21	12
Katsiaryna Nialepka; Nadzeya Bohdan (C); Darya Lipinskaya; Natallia Baklaha	Girls' basketball	Singapore; W 32-9	3	Ivory Coast; W 33-7	Italy; L 28-29	Russia; L 18-21	12
Katsiaryna Nialepka; Nadzeya Bohdan (C); Darya Lipinskaya; Natallia Baklaha	Girls' basketball	Germany; L 13-15	3	Ivory Coast; W 33-7	Italy; L 28-29	Russia; L 18-21	12
Katsiaryna Nialepka; Nadzeya Bohdan (C); Darya Lipinskaya; Natallia Baklaha	Girls' basketball	United States; L 5-33	3	Ivory Coast; W 33-7	Italy; L 28-29	Russia; L 18-21	12

== Boxing ==
Boys

Athlete	Event	Preliminaries	Semifinals	Final	Rank
Vadzim Kirylenka	Light Flyweight (48kg)	Ryan Burnett (IRL); L 0-12	Did not advance	5th Place Bout; Haziza Matusi (RWA); W w/o	5

== Canoeing ==
Boys

Athlete	Event	Time trial		Round 1	Round 2 (Rep)	Round 3	Round 4	Round 5	Final	Rank
Athlete	Event	Time	Rank	Round 1	Round 2 (Rep)	Round 3	Round 4	Round 5	Final	Rank
Andrei Tsarykovich	Boys' K1 slalom	1:49.24	16	Martin (GBR); L 1:43.89-1:34.23	Stowman (RSA); L 1:48.48-1:42.91	Urban (SVK); L 1:46.61-1:30.97	Did not advance			
Andrei Tsarykovich	Boys' K1 sprint	1:30.85	2	Dipoko (CMR); W 1:32.87-2:46.30		Aghamirzaeijenaghrad (IRI); W 1:31.20-1:31.94	Dolata (POL); W 1:32.46-1:35.55	Libscher (GER); L 1:37.29-1:31.83	Garcia (ESP); L 1:32.60-1:32.47	4

Girls

Athlete	Event	Time trial		Round 1	Round 2 (Rep)	Round 3	Round 4	Round 5	Final
Athlete	Event	Time	Rank	Round 1	Round 2 (Rep)	Round 3	Round 4	Round 5	Final
Aliaksandra Hryshyna	Girls' K1 slalom	1:59.57	17	Wang (SIN); L 1:58.30-1:47.23	Ceita (STP); W 1:54.01-2:40.07	Fox (AUS); L 2:01.26-1:37.10	Did not advance		
Aliaksandra Hryshyna	Girls' K1 sprint	1:44.46	6	Novak (SLO); W 1:46.21-1:51.89		Fox (AUS); W 1:45.27-1:46.60	Huang (CHN); L 1:45.94-1:42.71	Did not advance	

== Cycling ==
Cross country

Athlete	Event	Time	Rank	Points
Mikita Zharoven	Boys' cross country	-2LAP	26	72
Volha Masiukovich	Girls' cross country	58:29	20	40

Time trial

Athlete	Event	Time	Rank	Points
Kazstantsin Khviyuzan	Boys' time trial	4:08.84	8	18
Volha Masiukovich	Girls' time trial	3:37.03	12	34

BMX

Athlete	Event			Quarterfinals							Semifinals							Final		
Athlete	Event			Run 1		Run 2		Run 3		Rank	Run 1		Run 2		Run 3		Rank	Final		
Athlete	Event	Time	Rank	Time	Rank	Time	Rank	Time	Rank	Rank	Time	Rank	Time	Rank	Time	Rank	Rank	Time	Rank	Points
Pavel Rahel	Boys' BMX	DNF	31	DNS	8	DNS	8	DSQ		DSQ	Did not advance									72
Volha Masiukovich	Girls' BMX	54.982	26	47.227	6	47.267	6	48.267	6	6	Did not advance									40

Road race

Athlete	Event	Time	Rank	Points
Mikita Zharoven	Boys' road race	1:05:44	16	65*
Kanstantsin Khviyuzan	Boys' road race	1:05:44	39	
Pavel Rahel	Boys' road race	1:15:40	60	

Overall

Team	Event	Cross country pts		Time trial pts		BMX pts		Road race Pts	Total	Rank
Team	Event	Boys	Girls	Boys	Girls	Boys	Girls	Road race Pts	Total	Rank
Volha Masiukovich; Mikita Zharoven; Kanstantsin Khviyuzan; Pavel Rahel	Mixed team	72	40	18	34	72	40	65*	341	26

- * Received -5 for finishing road race with all three racers

== Fencing ==
Group stage

Athlete	Event	Match 1	Match 2	Match 3	Match 4	Match 5	Match 6	Seed
Mikhail Akula	Boys' sabre	Hubers (GER); L 2-5	Zatko (FRA); W 5-3	Sirbu (ROU); W 5-2	Wang (HKG); W 5-1	Elsissy (EGY); W 5-1	Kondo (NIG); W 5-0	2

Knock-Out Stage

Athlete	Event	Round of 16	Quarterfinals	Semifinals	Final	Rank
Mikhail Akula	Boys' sabre		Okunev (RUS); W 15-12	Affede (ITA); L 12-15	Hubers (GER); L 13-15	4
Europe 3 Alina Komaschuk (UKR); Tomasz Kruk (POL); Dora Lupkovics (HUN); Mikhail Akula (BLR); Yulia Bakhareva (RUS); Kirill Lichagin (RUS)	Mixed team		Americas 1 L 28-30	5th-8th Americas 2 W 30-23	5th-6th Europe 4 L 29-30	6

== Gymnastics ==
=== Artistic gymnastics ===
Boys

Athlete	Event	Floor		pommel horse		Rings		vault		parallel Bars		Horizontal Bar		Total	
Athlete	Event	Score	Rank	Score	Rank	Score	Rank	Score	Rank	Score	Rank	Score	Rank	Score	Rank
Vasili Mikhalitsyn	Boys' qualification	13.300	26	13.600	8 Q	13.300	23	13.900	39	13.550	15	12.700	28	80.350	24

Athlete	Event	Score	Rank
Vasili Mikhalitsyn	Boys' pommel horse	13.450	4

Girls

Athlete	Event	vault		uneven bars		Beam		Floor		Total	
Athlete	Event	Score	Rank	Score	Rank	Score	Rank	Score	Rank	Score	Rank
Lizaveta Parfionava	Girls' qualification	12.300	37	7.600	40	9.550	42	11.850	29	41.300	38

=== Rhythmic gymnastics ===
Individual

Athlete	Event	Qualification						Final					
Athlete	Event	Rope	Hoop	Ball	Clubs	Total	Rank	Rope	Hoop	Ball	Clubs	Total	Rank
Arina Charopa	Girls' individual all-around	25.925	25.550	25.500	25.250	102.225	2 Q	25.300	23.550	25.775	25.775	100.400	Silver medal

=== Trampoline ===
Athlete	Event	Qualification				Final	
Athlete	Event	Routine 1	Routine 2	Total	Rank	Routine 1	Rank
Aleh Rabtsau	Boys' trampoline	26.300	37.400	63.700	6 Q	37.300	6
Sviatlana Makshtarova	Girls' trampoline	27.500	37.100	64.600	3 Q	37.700	Silver medal

== Judo ==
Individual

Athlete	Event	Round 1	Round 2	Round 3	Semifinals	Final	Rank
Athlete	Event	Opposition Result	Opposition Result	Opposition Result	Opposition Result	Opposition Result	Rank
Vita Valnova	Girls' -44 kg	BYE	Batizi (HUN); L 000-101		Repechage; Rahming (BAH); W 100-000	Bronze Medal Match; Cano (PER); W 001-000	

Team

Team	Event	Round 1	Round 2	Semifinals	Final	Rank
Team	Event	Opposition Result	Opposition Result	Opposition Result	Opposition Result	Rank
Munich; Vita Valnova (BLR); Kęstutis Vitkauskas (LTU); Un Ju Ri (PRK); Beka Tugushi (GEO); Jalil Jalilov (AZE); Caren Chammas (LIB); Yacov Mamistvalov (ISR)	Mixed team	Essen; L 3-4	Did not advance			

== Modern pentathlon ==
Athlete	Event	Fencing (épée One Touch)			Swimming (200m freestyle)			Running & Shooting (3000m, Laser Pistol)			Total Points	Final Rank
Athlete	Event	Results	Rank	Points	Time	Rank	Points	Time	Rank	Points	Total Points	Final Rank
Aliaksandr Biruk	Boys' individual	12-11	7	840	2:07.32	5	1276	11:03.82	4	2348	4464	6
Marharyta Maseikava	Girls' individual	7-16	22	640	2:21.80	5	1100	13:02.76	10	1872	3612	13
Zsófia Földházi (HUN); Aliaksandr Biruk (BLR)	Mixed relay	45-47	13	810	1:58.39	1	1380	15:36.70	7	2336	4526	4
Marharyta Maseikava (BLR); German Sobolev (KAZ)	Mixed relay	44-48	15	800	2:07.98	18	1268	16:49.94	18	2044	4112	19

== Rowing ==
Athlete	Event	Heats		Repechage		Semifinals		Final		Overall Rank
Athlete	Event	Time	Rank	Time	Rank	Time	Rank	Time	Rank	Overall Rank
Siarhei Valadzko; Roman Budzko	Boys' pair	3:25.75	4 QR	3:33.32	4	Did not advance				13
Tanya Misachenka; Nadzeya Misachenka	Girls' pair	3:44.51	3 QA/B			3:50.77	4 QB	3:42.29	3	9

== Sailing ==
Windsurfing

Athlete	Event	Race											Points	Rank
Athlete	Event	1	2	3	4	5	6	7	8	9	10	M*	Points	Rank
Anastasiya Valkevich	Girls' Techno 293	11	4	5	1	3	~~OCS~~	8	4	10	6	2	54	7

== Shooting ==
Pistol

Athlete	Event	Qualification		Final		
Athlete	Event	Score	Rank	Score	Total	Rank
Aliaksei Horbach	Boys' 10m air pistol	571	6 Q	99.8	670.8	4
Kseniya Faminykh	Girls' 10m air pistol	DNF		Did not advance		

Rifle

Athlete	Event	Qualification		Final		
Athlete	Event	Score	Rank	Score	Total	Rank
Illia Charheika	Boys' 10m air rifle	593	2 Q	101.1	694.1	Silver medal

== Swimming ==
Athletes	Event	Heat		Semifinal		Final	
Athletes	Event	Time	Position	Time	Position	Time	Position
Yaraslau Pronin	Boys' 200m freestyle	1:56.30	27			Did not advance	
Yaraslau Pronin	Boys' 400m freestyle	4:07.90	21			Did not advance	
Aksana Dziamidava	Girls' 50m freestyle	DNS		Did not advance			
Aksana Dziamidava	Girls' 100m freestyle	58.22	14 Q	57.49	9	Did not advance	
Aksana Dziamidava	Girls' 200m freestyle	2:07.98	26			Did not advance	

== Table tennis ==
Individual

Athlete	Event	Round 1		Round 2		Quarterfinals	Semifinals	Final	Rank
Athlete	Event	Group matches	Rank	Group matches	Rank	Quarterfinals	Semifinals	Final	Rank
Katsiaryna Baravok	Girls' singles	Szocs (ROU); L 1-3 (11-9, 8-11, 9-11, 8-11)	3 qB	Phan (AUS); W 3-1 (11-7, 8-11, 11-4, 11-4)	2	Did not advance			21
Katsiaryna Baravok	Girls' singles	Giardi (SMR); W 3-0 (11-5, 11-9, 11-5)	3 qB	Pang (FRA); L 2-3 (9-11, 11-8, 11-5, 3-11, 8-11)	2	Did not advance			21
Katsiaryna Baravok	Girls' singles	Eerland (NED); L 0-3 (5-11, 6-11, 5-11)	3 qB	Rosheuvel (GUY); W 3-0 (11-4, 11-2, 11-4)	2	Did not advance			21

Team

Athlete	Event	Round 1		Round 2	Quarterfinals	Semifinals	Final	Rank
Athlete	Event	Group matches	Rank	Round 2	Quarterfinals	Semifinals	Final	Rank
Europe 5 Katsiaryna Baravok (BLR); Ondrej Bajger (CZE)	Mixed team	Korea; Yang (KOR); Kim (KOR); L 0-3 (1-3, 1-3, 0-3)	3 qB	Sri Lanka; Vithanage (SRI); Marakkala (SRI); W 2-0 (3-2, 3-2)	Intercontinental 2 Noskova (RUS); Holikov (UZB); W 2-0 (w/o)	Did not advance		17
Europe 5 Katsiaryna Baravok (BLR); Ondrej Bajger (CZE)	Mixed team	Intercontinental 4 Giardi (SMR); Massah (MAW); W 3-0 (3-1, 3-0, 3-0)	3 qB	Sri Lanka; Vithanage (SRI); Marakkala (SRI); W 2-0 (3-2, 3-2)	Intercontinental 2 Noskova (RUS); Holikov (UZB); W 2-0 (w/o)	Did not advance		17
Europe 5 Katsiaryna Baravok (BLR); Ondrej Bajger (CZE)	Mixed team	Hungary; Nagyvaradi (HUN); Lakatos (HUN); L 1-2 (0-3, 0-3, 3-1)	3 qB	Sri Lanka; Vithanage (SRI); Marakkala (SRI); W 2-0 (3-2, 3-2)	Intercontinental 2 Noskova (RUS); Holikov (UZB); W 2-0 (w/o)	Did not advance		17

== Taekwondo ==
Athlete	Event	Quarterfinal	Semifinal	Final	Rank
Aliaksandr Shmakau	Boys' +73kg	Ibrahim Ahmadsei (GER); L 5-6	Did not advance		5

== Tennis ==
singles

Athlete	Event	Round 1	Round 2	Quarterfinals	Semifinals	Final	Rank
Ilona Kremen	Girls' singles	Ishizu (JPN); W 2-0 (6-3, 6-3)	Kumkhum (THA); L 1-2 (6-1, 3-6, 0-6)	Did not advance			

doubles

Athlete	Event	Round 1	Quarterfinals	Semifinals	Final	Rank
Mai Grage (DEN); Ilona Kremen (BLR)	Girls' doubles	Jodoin (CAN); Paliivets (CAN); W 2-0 (6-1, 7-6)	Čepelová (SVK); Škamlová (SVK); L 0-2 (4-6, 3-6)	Did not advance		

== Weightlifting ==
Athlete	Event	Snatch	Clean & Jerk	Total	Rank
Aliaksandr Venskel	Boys' 85kg	137	170	307	4

== Wrestling ==
Freestyle

Athlete	Event	Pools		Final	Rank
Athlete	Event	Groups	Rank	Final	Rank
Aliaksandr Hushtyn	Boys' 76kg	Ergashev (UZB); L 0–2 (1–1+, 1–5)	3	5th Place Match; Kouagou (BEN); W Fall (6–2, 5–1)	5
Aliaksandr Hushtyn	Boys' 76kg	Webb (CAN); W 2–0 (6–1, 7–0)	3	5th Place Match; Kouagou (BEN); W Fall (6–2, 5–1)	5
Aliaksandr Hushtyn	Boys' 76kg	Kalayci (TUR); L T. Fall (0–7, 0–8)	3	5th Place Match; Kouagou (BEN); W Fall (6–2, 5–1)	5

Greco-Roman

Athlete	Event	Pools		Final	Rank
Athlete	Event	Groups	Rank	Final	Rank
Andrei Pikuza	Boys' 50kg	Makhtarov (AZE); L 0–2 (0–3, 0–3)	3	5th Place Match; Boughazi (ALG); W Fall (9–0)	5
Andrei Pikuza	Boys' 50kg	Banguela (CUB); L 0–2 (0–1, 0–3)	3	5th Place Match; Boughazi (ALG); W Fall (9–0)	5
Aliaksandr Nedashkouski	Boys' 69kg	Gonzalez (NCA); W 2–0 (6–0, 3–0)	2	3rd Place Match; Ghaderian (IRI); L 1–2 (4–2, 0–4, 0-4)	4
Aliaksandr Nedashkouski	Boys' 69kg	Kandybayev (KAZ); L 0–2 (0–1, 2–3)	2	3rd Place Match; Ghaderian (IRI); L 1–2 (4–2, 0–4, 0-4)	4
Aliaksandr Nedashkouski	Boys' 69kg	Valor (COL); W 2–0 (5–0, 3–0)	2	3rd Place Match; Ghaderian (IRI); L 1–2 (4–2, 0–4, 0-4)	4
