= Boxing at the 2010 Summer Youth Olympics – Men's 69 kg =

Boxing competitions

These are the results of the Men's Welter 69 kg competition in boxing at the 2010 Summer Youth Olympics in Singapore. Preliminaries were held on August 21, semifinals on August 22, 5th place bout on August 23, the bronze medal bout on August 24 and the Final bout on August 25. Unlike world championships and the Olympic Games, only one bronze medal is awarded.

== Medalists ==
David Lourenço
Brazil
Ahmad Mamadjanov
Uzbekistan
Nursähet Pazzyýew
Turkmenistan

== Results ==
Preliminaries
David Lourenço (BRA)	6
Ben Muziyo (ZAM)	2
Denis Radovan (GER)	1
Islomzhon Dalibaev (KGZ)	4

Semifinals
Nursähet Pazzyýew (TKM)	0
Ahmad Mamadjanov (UZB)	2
David Lourenço (BRA)	2
Islomzhon Dalibaev (KGZ)	1

Final
Ahmad Mamadjanov (UZB)	3
David Lourenço (BRA)	7
Third place
Nursähet Pazzyýew (TKM)	7
Islomzhon Dalibaev (KGZ)	0

5th place bout
Ben Muziyo (ZAM)	6
Denis Radovan (GER)	13
