= Athletics at the 2010 Summer Youth Olympics – Girls' triple jump =

Athletics – Girls' triple jump at the I Summer Youth Olympic Games
- Venue: Bishan Stadium
- Date: August 19–23
- Competitors: 14 from 14 nations

Medalists
| 1st place, gold medalist(s) | | Khadijatou Sagnia | Sweden |
| 2nd place, silver medalist(s) | | Sokhna Galle | France |
| 3rd place, bronze medalist(s) | | Ganna Aleksandrova | Ukraine |

The Girls' Triple Jump event at the 2010 Youth Olympic Games was held on 19–23 August 2010 in Bishan Stadium.

== Schedule ==
| Date | Time | Round |
|---|---|---|
| 19 August 2010 | 09:00 | Qualification |
| 23 August 2010 | 09:40 | Final |

== Results ==
=== Qualification ===
| Rank | Athlete | 1 | 2 | 3 | 4 | Result | Notes | Q |
|---|---|---|---|---|---|---|---|---|
| 1 | Khadijatou Sagnia (SWE) | 13.21 | x | 12.48 | - | 13.21 | | FA |
| 2 | Sokhna Galle (FRA) | 12.54 | 12.92 | x | - | 12.92 | | FA |
| 3 | Ganna Aleksandrova (UKR) | 12.49 | 12.49 | 11.26 | 12.22 | 12.49 | | FA |
| 4 | Rochelle Farquarson (JAM) | 12.40 | 11.91 | 12.32 | - | 12.40 | | FA |
| 5 | Ines Ikic (CRO) | x | 11.88 | 12.37 | 12.02 | 12.37 | | FA |
| 6 | Anastasiya Baykova (UZB) | 11.99 | 11.97 | 12.33 | 12.30 | 12.33 | | FA |
| 7 | Sandra Raickovic (SRB) | 12.30 | x | x | x | 12.30 | | FA |
| 8 | Ariadna Ramos (ESP) | 11.80 | 11.74 | 12.13 | 11.85 | 12.13 | | FA |
| 9 | Ivonne Rangel (MEX) | 11.92 | 12.07 | 11.76 | 11.92 | 12.07 | | FB |
| 10 | Dovile Dzindzaletaite (LTU) | 11.23 | 12.00 | x | 12.01 | 12.01 | | FB |
| 11 | Julia Dieckmann (GER) | 11.42 | 11.63 | 11.89 | 11.88 | 11.89 | | FB |
| 12 | Chia-Lun Tsai (TPE) | x | 11.57 | 11.79 | 11.63 | 11.79 | | FB |
| 13 | Thi Tuoi Nguyen (VIE) | 11.72 | x | x | 11.75 | 11.75 | | FB |
| | Valentina Da Rocha (RSA) | | | | | DNS | | FB |

=== Finals ===
==== Final B ====
| Rank | Athlete | 1 | 2 | 3 | 4 | Result | Notes |
|---|---|---|---|---|---|---|---|
| 1 | Dovile Dzindzaletaite (LTU) | 12.21 | x | 12.25 | 12.40 | 12.40 | |
| 2 | Ivonne Rangel (MEX) | x | 11.97 | 12.24 | 12.31 | 12.31 | |
| 3 | Chia-Lun Tsai (TPE) | x | 11.69 | 11.94 | x | 11.94 | |
| 4 | Thi Tuoi Nguyen (VIE) | x | x | 11.71 | 11.81 | 11.81 | |
| 5 | Julia Dieckmann (GER) | x | 11.60 | x | 11.62 | 11.62 | |
| | Valentina Da Rocha (RSA) | | | | | DNS | |

==== Final A ====
| Rank | Athlete | 1 | 2 | 3 | 4 | Result | Notes |
|---|---|---|---|---|---|---|---|
| 1st place, gold medalist(s) | Khadijatou Sagnia (SWE) | 12.94 | 13.56 | x | 12.90 | 13.56 | PB |
| 2nd place, silver medalist(s) | Sokhna Galle (FRA) | x | 13.04 | x | x | 13.04 | |
| 3rd place, bronze medalist(s) | Ganna Aleksandrova (UKR) | 12.34 | 12.26 | 12.28 | 12.64 | 12.64 | |
| 4 | Rochelle Farquarson (JAM) | 12.16 | 12.37 | 12.57 | 12.25 | 12.57 | SB |
| 5 | Ines Ikic (CRO) | x | 12.54 | x | 12.12 | 12.54 | |
| 6 | Ariadna Ramos (ESP) | 11.73 | 11.91 | 12.14 | 12.43 | 12.43 | |
| 7 | Anastasiya Baykova (UZB) | 12.17 | 12.39 | 12.03 | x | 12.39 | |
| | Sandra Raichovic (SRB) | x | - | - | - | NM | |
