= Yuriy Fedechko =

Ukrainian modern pentathlete

Personal information
- Nationality: Ukrainian
- Born: 15 August 1992 (age 33)

Sport
- Country: Ukraine
- Sport: Modern pentathlon
Medal record
Representing Ukraine
World Championships
Bronze medal – third place	2018 Mexico City	Team
European Championships
Gold medal – first place	2015 Bath	Relay
Bronze medal – third place	2018 Szekesfehervar	Team

Yuriy Fedechko (Ukrainian: Юрій Федечко; born 15 August 1992) is a Ukrainian modern pentathlete. He competed at the 2010 Summer Youth Olympics, where he was 12th in individual competition. He is 2015 European champion in men's relay, and 2018 European bronze medalist in men's team competition.
