= Boxing at the 2010 Summer Youth Olympics – Men's 60 kg =

Boxing competitions

These are the results of the Men's Light 60 kg competition in boxing at the 2010 Summer Youth Olympics in Singapore. Preliminaries were held on August 21, semifinals on August 22, 5th place bout on August 23, the bronze medal bout on August 24 and the Final bout on August 25. Unlike world championships and the Olympic Games, only one bronze medal is awarded.

== Medalists ==
Evaldas Petrauskas
Lithuania
Brett Mather
Australia
Krishan Vikas
India

== Results ==
Preliminaries
Thomas Vahrenholt (GER) | 2
Evaldas Petrauskas (LTU) | 6
Hrayr Matevosyan (ARM) | 2
Krishan Vikas (IND) | 7

Semifinals
Daniel Echeverria (MEX) | 7
Brett Mather (AUS) | 8
Evaldas Petrauskas (LTU) | 4
Krishan Vikas (IND) | 3

Final
Brett Mather (AUS) | 4
Evaldas Petrauskas (LTU) | 13
Third place
Daniel Echeverria (MEX)
Krishan Vikas (IND) | DSQ

| 5th place bout |
| Thomas Vahrenholt (GER) |
| Hrayr Matevosyan (ARM) | WO |
