= Boxing at the 2010 Summer Youth Olympics – Men's 81 kg =

Boxing competitions

These are the results of the Men's Light Heavy 81 kg competition in boxing at the 2010 Summer Youth Olympics in Singapore. Preliminaries were held on August 21, semifinals on August 22, 5th place bout on August 23, the bronze medal bout on August 24 and the Final bout on August 25. Unlike world championships and the Olympic Games, only one bronze medal is awarded.

== Medalists ==
Irosvani Duverger
Cuba
Burak Aksin
Turkey
Sardorbek Begaliev
Uzbekistan

== Results ==
Preliminaries
Anzor Elpiev (RUS) | 1
Irosvani Duverger (CUB) | 7
Sardorbek Begaliev (UZB) | 4
Bijan Khojasteh (IRI) | 2

Semifinals
Ytalo Perea (ECU) | 0
Burak Aksin (TUR) | 7
Irosvani Duverger (CUB) | 3
Sardorbek Begaliev (UZB) | 1

Final
Burak Aksin (TUR) | 4
Irosvani Duverger (CUB) | 12
Third place
Ytalo Perea (ECU) | 2
Sardorbek Begaliev (UZB) | 5

| 5th place bout |
| Anzor Elpiev (RUS) | 10 |
| Bijan Khojasteh (IRI) | 3 |
