= Benin at the 2010 Summer Youth Olympics =

- IOC code: BEN
- NOC: Comité National Olympique et Sportif Béninois

in Singapore
- Competitors: 4 in 3 sports
- Flag bearer: Ariane Amouro

Summer Youth Olympics appearances
- 2010; 2014; 2018

Benin competed at the 2010 Summer Youth Olympics, the inaugural Youth Olympic Games, held in Singapore from 14 August to 26 August 2010.

== Athletics ==
=== Girls ===
Track and Road Events

Athletes	Event	Qualification		Final	
Athletes	Event	Result	Rank	Result	Rank
Ariane Amouro	Girls’ 100m	13.45	25 qD	13.48	23
Loth Toni	Girls’ 400m	1:01.89	20 qC	DSQ	

== Taekwondo ==
Athlete	Event	Preliminary	Quarterfinal	Semifinal	Final	Rank
Jehudiel Kiki	Boys' -63kg	Mario Silva (POR); L 0-18	did not advance			9

== Wrestling ==
Freestyle

Athlete	Event	Pools		Final	Rank
Athlete	Event	Groups	Rank	Final	Rank
Victorin Kouagou	Boys' 76kg	Rogers (USA); L Fall (0–6)	3	5th Place Match; Hushtyn (BLR); L Fall (2–6, 1–5)	6
Victorin Kouagou	Boys' 76kg	Aguon (GUM); W Fall (7–0, 4–0)	3	5th Place Match; Hushtyn (BLR); L Fall (2–6, 1–5)	6
Victorin Kouagou	Boys' 76kg	Ali (EGY); L Fall (0–3)	3	5th Place Match; Hushtyn (BLR); L Fall (2–6, 1–5)	6
