= Athletics at the 2010 Summer Youth Olympics – Boys' triple jump =

Athletics – Boys' triple jump at the I Summer Youth Olympic Games
- Venue: Bishan Stadium
- Date: August 19–23
- Competitors: 14 from 14 nations

Medalists
1st place, gold medalist(s)		Radame Fabar Sanchez	Cuba
2nd place, silver medalist(s)		Fu Haitao	China
3rd place, bronze medalist(s)		Georgi Tsonov	Bulgaria

The boys' triple jump event at the 2010 Youth Olympic Games was held on 19–23 August 2010 in Bishan Stadium.

== Schedule ==
Date	Time	Round
19 August 2010	10:40	Qualification
23 August 2010	19:45	Final

== Results ==
=== Qualification ===
Rank	Athlete	1	2	3	4	Result	Notes	Q
1	Radame Fabar Sanchez (CUB)	15.99	15.60	–	–	15.99	PB	FA
2	Yevgen Strokan (UKR)	15.92	x	–	–	15.92	PB	FA
3	Paulo Sérgio Oliveira (BRA)	x	14.69	15.44	15.24	15.44		FA
4	Fu Haitao (CHN)	15.42	15.02	15.43	15.10	15.43		FA
5	Georgi Tsonov (BUL)	x	15.38	15.22	x	15.38		FA
6	Ruslan Kurbanov (UZB)	x	15.11	14.80	15.32	15.32		FA
7	Marty Loic Darren Paul (MRI)	14.58	15.06	x	x	15.06		FA
8	Atsu Nyamadi (GHA)	14.75	x	14.93	x	14.93	PB	FA
9	Nikolaos Tsiokos (GRE)	x	x	14.80	14.11	14.80		FB
10	Lathone Minns (BAH)	14.66	x	–	14.50	14.66		FB
11	Yauhen Rabtsevich (BLR)	14.42	14.12	14.28	14.50	14.50		FB
12	Musa Tuzen (TUR)	14.18	13.94	14.42	14.16	14.42		FB
13	Hussain Alkhalaf (KSA)	14.12	x	x	x	14.12		FB
	Adrian Józefowicz (POL)	x	x	x	–	NM		FB

=== Finals ===
==== Final B ====
Rank	Athlete	1	2	3	4	Result	Notes
1	Lathone Minns (BAH)	14.53	14.86	14.75	14.41	14.86	
2	Nikolaos Tsiokos (GRE)	14.71	x	14.80	x	14.80	
3	Hussain Alkhalaf (KSA)	14.79	x	x	14.79	14.79	
4	Musa Tuzen (TUR)	14.30	14.17	13.71	13.91	14.30	
5	Yauhen Rabtsevich (BLR)	x	x	13.99	14.06	14.06	
	Adrian Józefowicz (POL)					DNS	

==== Final A ====
Rank	Athlete	1	2	3	4	Result	Notes
1st place, gold medalist(s)	Radame Fabar Sanchez (CUB)	15.62	15.91	x	16.37	16.37	PB
2nd place, silver medalist(s)	Fu Haitao (CHN)	15.96	16.14	15.91	x	16.14	PB
3rd place, bronze medalist(s)	Georgi Tsonov (BUL)	15.48	15.80	15.52	x	15.80	
4	Yevgen Strokan (UKR)	15.38	15.47	15.71	14.40	15.71	
5	Paulo Sérgio Oliveira (BRA)	15.17	x	15.63	15.30	15.63	PB
6	Ruslan Kurbanov (UZB)	15.21	15.47	15.13	15.48	15.48	
7	Marty Loic Darren Paul (MRI)	14.89	14.75	x	14.77	14.89	
8	Atsu Nyamadi (GHA)	14.49	14.51	14.51	13.24	14.51	
