= Modern pentathlon at the 2010 Summer Youth Olympics – Boys' individual =

The boy's Modern pentathlon competitions at the 2010 Summer Youth Olympics in Singapore were held on August 22, 2010 at the Singapore Sports School.

Only the fencing, swimming, shooting and running portions were done at the Youth Olympics. The results of each of the four segments of the modern pentathlon were converted into points scores based on a par value of 1000 points per event. Competitors doing better than par would receive more points. At the end of the first two segments, the points would be calculated and the pentathletes would be handicapped for the final segment based on their scores such that a simultaneous finish in that segment would result in identical overall scores.

The first segment was one touch épée, the second was 200 metre freestyle swimming and the final segment was combined running and shooting where athletes ran a total of 3000 metres and shot using the laser pistol.

== Medalists ==
Gold	Silver	Bronze
Dae Beom Kim; South Korea	Ilya Shugarov; Russia	Jorge Camacho; Mexico

== Results ==
Rank	Athlete	Fencing		Swimming		Running and Shooting		Total
Rank	Athlete	Wins-Loss	Points	Time	Points	Time	Points	Total
Gold medal	Dae Beom Kim (KOR)	12-11	840	2:03.04	1324	10:44.35	2424	4588
Silver medal	Ilya Shugarov (RUS)	17-6	1040	2:06.40	1284	11:29.42	2244	4568
Bronze medal	Jorge Camacho (MEX)	16-7	1000	2:13.28	1204	11:04.05	2344	4548
4	Gergely Demeter (HUN)	10-13	760	2:02.24	1336	10:41.15	2436	4532
5	Aleix Heredia (ESP)	14-9	920	2:17.41	1152	10:51.00	2396	4468
6	Aliaksandr Biruk (BLR)	12-11	840	2:07.32	1276	11:03.82	2348	4464
7	Karol Dziudziek (POL)	15-8	960	2:13.07	1204	11:34.22	2224	4388
8	Valentine Prades (FRA)	13-10	880	2:14.00	1192	11:17.52	2292	4364
9	Lukas Kontrimavicius (LTU)	11-12	800	2:09.68	1244	11:11.74	2316	4360
10	Eslam Hamad (EGY)	12-11	840	2:07.39	1272	11:32.30	2232	4344
11	Jiahao Han (CHN)	12-11	840	2:01.49	1344	11:52.80	2152	4336
12	Yuriy Fedechko (UKR)	12-11	840	2:08.19	1264	11:38.74	2208	4312
13	Nathan Schrimsher (USA)	12-11	840	2:08.19	1264	12:02.95	2112	4215
14	Jan Szalay (SVK)	17-6	1040	2:10.42	1236	12:47.47	1932	4208
15	Eric Kruger (GER)	8-15	668	2:13.8	1196	11:15.01	2300	4164
16	Greg Longden (GBR)	7-16	640	2:09.99	1244	11:28.57	2248	4132
17	William Muinhos (BRA)	7-16	640	2:09.97	1244	11:34.93	2224	4108
18	Doycho Ivanov (BUL)	11-12	800	2:17.65	1152	11:56.20	2136	4088
19	Ilias Baktybekov (KGZ)	12-11	840	2:18.43	1140	12:27.13	2012	3992
20	German Sobolev (KAZ)	9-14	720	2:18.09	1144	12:10.35	2080	3944
21	Jorge David Imeri Cabrera (GUA)	10-13	740	2:15.99	1172	12:24.00	2024	3936
22	Andrea Micalizzi (ITA)	8-15	680	2:07.36	1272	12:47.65	1932	3884
23	Martin Bilko (CZE)	6-17	600	2:12.40	1212	12:24.60	2024	3836
24	Todd Renfree (AUS)	5-16	560	2:21.65	1104	12:24.70	2024	3688
