= Wrestling at the 2010 Summer Youth Olympics – Boys' freestyle 76 kg =

The boys' 76 kg tournament in wrestling at the 2010 Summer Youth Olympics was held on August 17 at the International Convention Centre.

The event limited competitors to a maximum of 76 kilograms of body mass. The tournament had two groups where wrestlers compete in a round-robin format. The winners of each group would go on to play for the gold medal, second placers played for the bronze medal while everyone else played for classification depending on where they ranked in the group stage.

== Medalists ==
Gold	Silver	Bronze
Resul Kalayci; Turkey	Jordan Rogers; United States	Dierbek Ergashev; Uzbekistan

== Group stages ==
=== Group A ===
Athlete	Pld	C. Points	T. Points
Jordan Rogers (USA)	3	11	30
Amr Ali (EGY)	3	9	23
Victorin Kouagou (BEN)	3	4	11
Christopher Aguon (GUM)	3	0	0

Jordan Rogers (USA)	Fall (6–0)	Victorin Kouagou (BEN)
Amr Ali (EGY)	T. Fall (7–0, 6–0)	Christopher Aguon (GUM)
Jordan Rogers (USA)	2-1 (2-2, 6–3, 2-2)	Amr Ali (EGY)
Victorin Kouagou (BEN)	Fall (7–0, 4–0)	Christopher Aguon (GUM)
Jordan Rogers (USA)	T. Fall (7–0, 6–0)	Christopher Aguon (GUM)
Victorin Kouagou (BEN)	Fall (0-3)	Amr Ali (EGY)

=== Group B ===
Athlete	Pld	C. Points	T. Points
Resul Kalayci (TUR)	3	10	28
Dierbek Ergashev (UZB)	3	7	16
Aliaksandr Hushtyn (BLR)	3	5	16
Dalton Webb (CAN)	3	2	2

Dierbek Ergashev (UZB)	0-2 (0-2, 1-1)	Resul Kalayci (TUR)
Aliaksandr Hushtyn (BLR)	2-0 (6–1, 7–0)	Dalton Webb (CAN)
Dierbek Ergashev (UZB)	2-0 (1–1, 5–1)	Aliaksandr Hushtyn (BLR)
Resul Kalayci (TUR)	2-0 (4–0, 6–1)	Dalton Webb (CAN)
Dierbek Ergashev (UZB)	2-0 (3–0, 6–0)	Dalton Webb (CAN)
Resul Kalayci (TUR)	T. Fall (7–0, 8–1)	Aliaksandr Hushtyn (BLR)

== Classification ==
=== 7th-place match ===
Christopher Aguon (GUM)	Fall (0-4)	Dalton Webb (CAN)

=== 5th-place match ===
Victorin Kouagou (BEN)	Fall (2-6, 1-5)	Aliaksandr Hushtyn (BLR)

=== Bronze-medal match ===
Amr Ali (EGY)	0-2 (0-2, 0-1)	Dierbek Ergashev (UZB)

=== Gold-medal match ===
Jordan Rogers (USA)	Fall (3-6)	Resul Kalayci (TUR)

== Final rankings ==
Rank	Athlete
Gold medal	Resul Kalayci (TUR)
Silver medal	Jordan Rogers (USA)
Bronze medal	Dierbek Ergashev (UZB)
4	Amr Ali (EGY)
5	Aliaksandr Hushtyn (BLR)
6	Victorin Kouagou (BEN)
7	Dalton Webb (CAN)
8	Christopher Aguon (GUM)
