= Maxamillian Schneider =

American judoka

Personal information
- Born: 3 May 1993 (age 33) Beverly Hills, California
- Home town: Chicago, Illinois
- Education: California Polytechnic State University
- Occupations: Judoka, wrestler

Sport
- Country: United States
- Sport: Judo
- Rank: 1st dan black belt
Medal record
Representing United States
Men's judo
Youth Olympic Games
Gold medal – first place	2010 Singapore	–66 kg
Pan American Cadet Championships
Gold medal – first place	2009 San Salvador	–66 kg
Wrestling
I.H.S.A. Wrestling Individual State Finals
Gold medal – first place	2010	145-pounds
Gold medal – first place	2012	152-pounds
Silver medal – second place	2009	135-pounds

Profile at external databases
- JudoInside.com: 53482
- Updated on 21 February 2022

Maxamillian Schneider is an American athlete in the sports of judo and wrestling. Schneider began practicing judo at a very early age. He graduated in 2012 from Lane Technical College Prep High School where he began his wrestling career. Schneider attended California Polytechnic State University in San Luis Obispo, California from 2012 to 2014.

== Judo ==
As a junior in high school, Maxamillian represented the United States of America as a judoka at the inaugural 2010 Summer Youth Olympics in Singapore, where he won a gold medal after ending every match with an ippon. Maxamillian has represented the United States in many competitions around the world, including in Japan, Budapest, South Korea, and South Africa. At the age of 23 Maxamillian was selected as a training partner for the 2016 Olympic games.

== High School Wrestling ==
As a freshman in 2009, Maxamillian placed second at the Illinois High School Association Wrestling Individual State Finals in the Class 3A 135 lbs. category, notably pinning then-senior Ellis Coleman of OPRF in the quarter finals. In 2010, Max became the state champion 145 lbs. and in 2012, he won his second state championship title at 152 lbs. Maxamillian is the first Chicago Public High School League wrestler to be a two-time state champion since 1953, and Lane Tech's first State wrestling champion in 64 years.

In his high school wrestling career, Maxamillian garnered 111 falls, and was named CPS Athlete of the Year in 2012

== College career ==
Schneider attended the California Polytechnic State University from 2012 to 2013 and was redshirted his first year with the Mustangs. During his first official season as a Mustang, he began with an 8–0 record and took first place at the Road Runner Open Nov. 17, 2013.
