= Jūratė Ščerbinskaitė =

Lithuanian swimmer (born 1994)

Personal information
- Nationality: Lithuania
- Born: 15 November 1994 (age 31) Kaunas, Lithuania

Sport
- Sport: Swimming
- Strokes: Freestyle
- Club: Plymouth Leander

Jūratė Ščerbinskaitė (born 15 November 1994) is a Lithuanian swimmer who specialized in long-length freestyle events.

== Career ==
Ščerbinskaitė participated in 2010 Summer Youth Olympics. She represented Lithuania at the 2013 World Aquatics Championships. In 200 metre freestyle she finished 32nd and failed to qualify for the semifinals.
