= Laura Naginskaitė =

Lithuanian judoka (born 1993)

Personal information
- Born: 10 August 1993 (age 32)
- Occupation: Judoka

Sport
- Country: Lithuania
- Sport: Judo
- Weight class: –63 kg

Achievements and titles
- World Champ.: R64 (2011)
- European Champ.: R32 (2011)
Medal record
Women's judo
Representing Lithuania
Youth Olympic Games
Bronze medal – third place	2010 Singapore	–63 kg

Profile at external databases
- IJF: 2774
- JudoInside.com: 48476
- Updated on 21 February 2022

Laura Naginskaitė (born 10 August 1993) is a Lithuanian judoka. She represented Lithuania at 2010 Summer Youth Olympics in Singapore, where she won bronze medal. In bronze medal final she defeated Reotem Shor from Israel 000-100.
