= 2010 Summer Youth Olympics medal table =

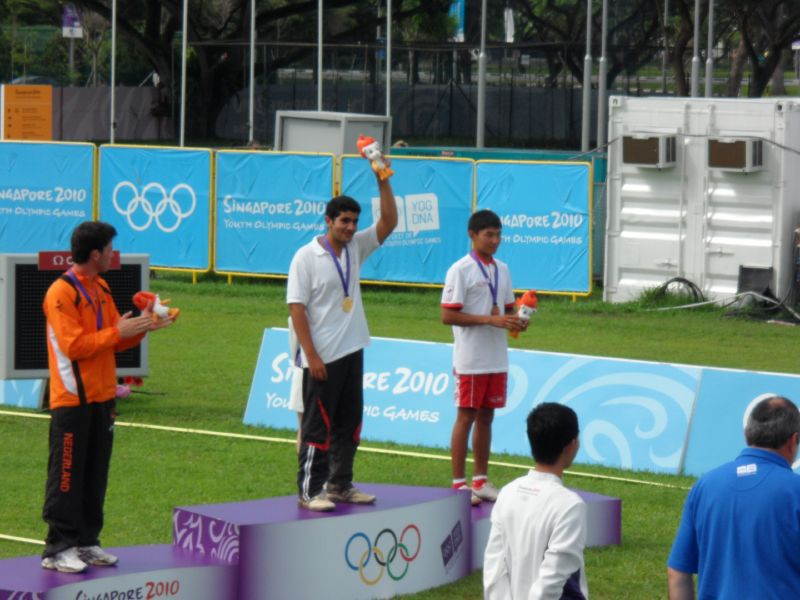
From left to right: Silver medallist Rick van den Oever (Netherlands), gold medallist Ibrahim Sabry (Egypt) and bronze medallist Bolot Tsybzhitov (Russia) on the podium with their medals won in the boys' event in archery.

The 2010 Summer Youth Olympics, officially known as the Singapore 2010 Youth Olympic Games (YOG), were an international multi-sport event held in Singapore from 14 to 26 August 2010. The event was the inaugural Youth Olympic Games, and it saw 3,531 athletes between 14 and 18 years of age competing in 201 events in 26 sports. This medal table ranks the 204 participating National Olympic Committees (NOCs) by the number of gold medals won by their athletes. The Kuwait Olympic Committee was suspended by the International Olympic Committee (IOC) prior to the Games, but Kuwaiti athletes were allowed to participate and the country is listed in the table, bearing the Olympic flag.

Of the nations that won medals at these Games, a total of nine had not won an Olympic medal – Bolivia, Bosnia and Herzegovina, Cyprus, Cambodia, Equatorial Guinea, Guatemala, Jordan, Nauru and Turkmenistan – thus their medals won in Singapore were their first medals at an Olympic event. A further three nations – Puerto Rico, Vietnam and the U.S. Virgin Islands – won their first gold medals at an Olympic event, having previously only won medals of other colours. In addition, the Netherlands Antilles won their last Olympic medal as the country was dissolved two months after the Games.

== Medal table ==
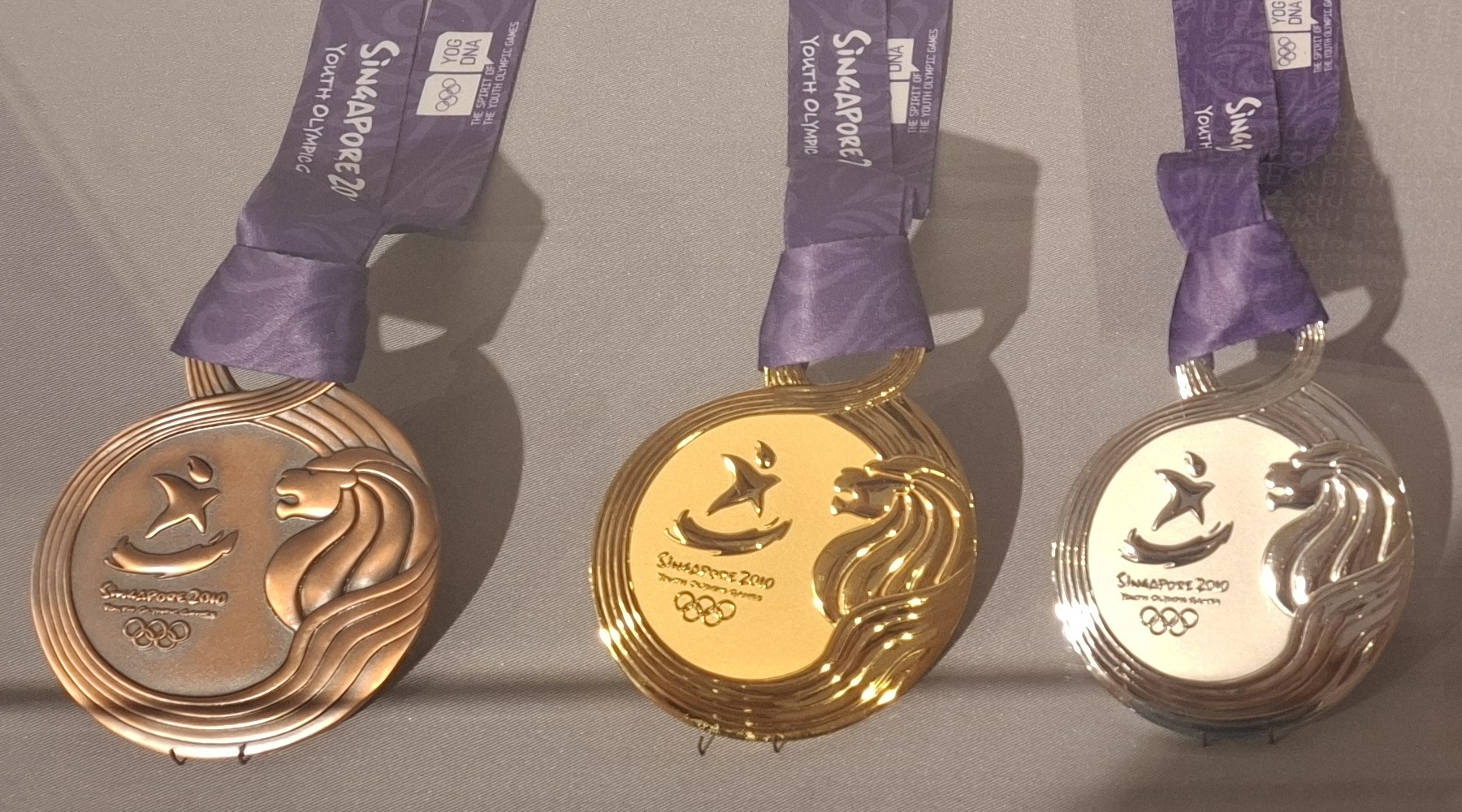
Medals of the 2010 Summer Youth Olympics

The Singapore Youth Olympic Games Organising Committee (SYOGOC) did not keep an official medal tally. The medal table is based on information provided by the IOC and is consistent with IOC conventional sorting in its published medal tables. The table uses the Olympic medal table sorting method. By default, the table is ordered by the number of gold medals the athletes from a nation have won, where a nation is an entity represented by a NOC. The number of silver medals is taken into consideration next and then the number of bronze medals. If teams are still tied, equal ranking is given and they are listed alphabetically by their IOC country code.

A total of 623 medals in 201 events (202 gold, 200 silver, and 221 bronze) were awarded; in judo and taekwondo two bronzes were awarded per event. Therefore, the total number of bronze medals is greater than the total number of gold or silver medals. Additionally there were ties for a gold and a bronze medal, both in swimming. On 15 October 2010, the IOC announced that a silver medallist had tested positive for a banned substance, and the medal was stripped.

In a number of events, there were teams in which athletes from different nations competed together. Medals won by these teams are included in the table as medals awarded to a mixed-NOCs team. There were eight events composed entirely of mixed-NOCs teams. As such, all medals in those events – 8 golds, 8 silvers and 9 bronzes (including two in judo) – were swept by mixed-NOCs teams. The remaining were won in events involving both mixed-NOCs teams and regular teams representing one NOC. This mixed-NOCs listing is not given a ranking.

* Host nation (Singapore)

2010 Summer Youth Olympics medal table
Rank	Nation	Gold	Silver	Bronze	Total
1	China	30	16	5	51
2	Russia	18	14	11	43
3	South Korea	11	4	4	19
4	Ukraine	9	9	15	33
–	Mixed-NOCs	9	8	11	28
5	Cuba	9	3	2	14
6	Australia	8	13	8	29
7	Japan	8	5	3	16
8	Hungary	6	4	5	15
9	France	6	2	7	15
10	Italy	5	9	5	19
11	Azerbaijan	5	3	0	8
12	Germany	4	9	9	22
13	United States	4	9	8	21
14	Thailand	4	3	0	7
15	Israel	3	2	0	5
16	Canada	3	1	8	12
17	Great Britain	3	1	5	9
18	Kenya	3	0	3	6
19	Lithuania	3	0	1	4
20	South Africa	2	4	3	9
21	Brazil	2	3	1	6
22	Colombia	2	3	0	5
22	Ethiopia	2	3	0	5
24	Egypt	2	2	2	6
24	Kazakhstan	2	2	2	6
26	Iran	2	2	1	5
27	Belgium	2	1	2	5
28	Sweden	2	0	3	5
29	Nigeria	2	0	2	4
30	Bulgaria	2	0	1	3
30	Slovenia	2	0	1	3
32	Mongolia	2	0	0	2
33	Spain	1	4	6	11
34	Romania	1	4	2	7
35	Turkey	1	3	6	10
36	Czech Republic	1	2	3	6
37	Argentina	1	2	2	5
38	Netherlands	1	2	1	4
38	New Zealand	1	2	1	4
40	North Korea	1	1	3	5
41	Vietnam	1	1	2	4
42	Croatia	1	1	1	3
42	Denmark	1	1	1	3
42	Serbia	1	1	1	3
45	Poland	1	0	5	6
46	Austria	1	0	3	4
47	Kyrgyzstan	1	0	2	3
48	Dominican Republic	1	0	1	2
48	Eritrea	1	0	1	2
50	Bolivia	1	0	0	1
50	Chile	1	0	0	1
50	Ireland	1	0	0	1
50	Jamaica	1	0	0	1
50	Puerto Rico	1	0	0	1
50	Trinidad and Tobago	1	0	0	1
50	Uruguay	1	0	0	1
50	Virgin Islands	1	0	0	1
58	India	0	6	2	8
59	Belarus	0	4	1	5
60	Chinese Taipei	0	3	0	3
61	Uzbekistan	0	2	5	7
62	Singapore*	0	2	4	6
63	Slovakia	0	2	3	5
63	Venezuela	0	2	3	5
65	Malaysia	0	2	0	2
66	Mexico	0	1	5	6
67	Armenia	0	1	3	4
67	Greece	0	1	3	4
69	Switzerland	0	1	2	3
70	Jordan	0	1	1	2
70	Moldova	0	1	1	2
70	Portugal	0	1	1	2
70	Tajikistan	0	1	1	2
74	Bahamas	0	1	0	1
74	Cyprus	0	1	0	1
74	Ecuador	0	1	0	1
74	Equatorial Guinea	0	1	0	1
74	Haiti	0	1	0	1
74	Hong Kong	0	1	0	1
74	Nauru	0	1	0	1
74	Pakistan	0	1	0	1
74	Qatar	0	1	0	1
83	Finland	0	0	2	2
84	Bosnia and Herzegovina	0	0	1	1
84	Cambodia	0	0	1	1
84	Georgia	0	0	1	1
84	Guatemala	0	0	1	1
84	Indonesia	0	0	1	1
84	Kuwait (KUW)^{[a]}	0	0	1	1
84	Latvia	0	0	1	1
84	Lebanon	0	0	1	1
84	Morocco	0	0	1	1
84	Netherlands Antilles	0	0	1	1
84	Norway	0	0	1	1
84	Peru	0	0	1	1
84	Saudi Arabia	0	0	1	1
84	Turkmenistan	0	0	1	1
84	Uganda	0	0	1	1
Totals (98 entries)		202	199	221	622

Source: IOC
- ^[a] Athletes from Kuwait competed under the Olympic flag as the Kuwait Olympic Committee had been suspended by the IOC in January 2010 for government interference.

== Changes in medal standings ==
List of changes in medal standings
Ruling date	Sport	Event	Nation	Gold	Silver	Bronze	Total
15 October 2010	Wrestling	Boys' Greco-Roman 50 kg	Uzbekistan		−1		−1

On 15 October 2010, the IOC announced that Nurbek Hakkulov, who won a silver medal for Uzbekistan in wrestling, and Johnny Pilay who finished fifth in a separate wrestling event for Ecuador, had tested positive for furosemide, a banned diuretic. Both were disqualified and Hakkulov was stripped of his silver medal, although no decision was taken on whether to promote bronze medallist Shadybek Sulaimanov and fourth-placed Johan Rodriguez Banguela in the event.
