= Judo at the 2010 Summer Youth Olympics =

Judo at the I Summer Youth Olympic Games
- Venue: Suntec Singapore Convention and Exhibition Centre
- Dates: 21 – 25 August 2010
- No. of events: 9 (4 boys, 4 girls, 1 mixed)

The Judo competition at the 2010 Summer Youth Olympics took place between 21 and 25 August in Singapore. There were a total of eight weight categories for both Boys and Girls.

== Competition schedule ==
Event date	Event day	Starting time	Event details
21 August	Saturday	18:00	Boys' -55 kg, Boys' -66 kg, Girls' -44 kg
22 August	Sunday	18:00	Girls' -52 kg, Boys' -81 kg, Girls' -63 kg
23 August	Monday	18:00	Girls' -78 kg, Boys' -100 kg
25 August	Wednesday	18:00	Mixed Team

== Medal summary ==
=== Medal table ===
Rank	Nation	Gold	Silver	Bronze	Total
1	Japan	2	0	0	2
1	South Korea	2	0	0	2
1	United States	2	0	0	2
–	Mixed-NOCs	1	1	2	4
4	Belgium	1	1	0	2
5	Czech Republic	1	0	0	1
6	Russia	0	2	0	2
7	Germany	0	1	1	2
7	Hungary	0	1	1	2
7	North Korea	0	1	1	2
10	Brazil	0	1	0	1
10	Uzbekistan	0	1	0	1
12	Ukraine	0	0	2	2
13	Armenia	0	0	1	1
13	Austria	0	0	1	1
13	Belarus	0	0	1	1
13	Cambodia	0	0	1	1
13	Croatia	0	0	1	1
13	Denmark	0	0	1	1
13	Kyrgyzstan	0	0	1	1
13	Lithuania	0	0	1	1
13	Slovakia	0	0	1	1
13	Slovenia	0	0	1	1
13	Spain	0	0	1	1
Totals (23 entries)		9	9	18	36

=== Boys' Events ===
Games	Gold	Silver	Bronze
-55 kg	David Pulkrabek; Czech Republic	Mansurkhuja Muminkhujaev; Uzbekistan	Dmytro Atanov; Ukraine
-55 kg	David Pulkrabek; Czech Republic	Mansurkhuja Muminkhujaev; Uzbekistan	Pedro Rivadulla; Spain
-66 kg	Maxamillian Schneider; United States	Hyon Song-chol; North Korea	Cai Phuc; Denmark
-66 kg	Maxamillian Schneider; United States	Hyon Song-chol; North Korea	Davit Ghazaryan; Armenia
-81 kg	Lee Jae-hyung; South Korea	Khasan Khalmurzaev; Russia	Arpád Szakács; Slovakia
-81 kg	Lee Jae-hyung; South Korea	Khasan Khalmurzaev; Russia	Krisztián Tóth; Hungary
-100 kg	Ryosuke Igarashi; Japan	Toma Nikiforov; Belgium	Marius Piepke; Germany
-100 kg	Ryosuke Igarashi; Japan	Toma Nikiforov; Belgium	Bolot Toktogonov; Kyrgyzstan

=== Girls' Events ===
Games	Gold	Silver	Bronze
-44 kg	Bae Seul-bi; South Korea	Barbara Batizi; Hungary	Sothea Sam; Cambodia
-44 kg	Bae Seul-bi; South Korea	Barbara Batizi; Hungary	Vita Valnova; Belarus
-52 kg	Katelyn Bouyssou; United States	Anna Dmitrieva; Russia	Ri Un-ju; North Korea
-52 kg	Katelyn Bouyssou; United States	Anna Dmitrieva; Russia	Christine Huck; Austria
-63 kg	Miku Tashiro; Japan	Flavia Gomes; Brazil	Barbara Matić; Croatia
-63 kg	Miku Tashiro; Japan	Flavia Gomes; Brazil	Laura Naginskaitė; Lithuania
-78 kg	Lola Mansour; Belgium	Natalia Kubin; Germany	Kseniya Darchuk; Ukraine
-78 kg	Lola Mansour; Belgium	Natalia Kubin; Germany	Urška Potočnik; Slovenia

=== Team Event ===
Games	Gold	Silver	Bronze
Team	Essen	Belgrade	Cairo
Team	Essen	Belgrade	Tokyo
