= Cycling at the 2010 Summer Youth Olympics – Combined mixed team =

Combined Mixed Team Event was the main event of cycling at the 2010 Summer Youth Olympics program. Each team consisted of three boys and one girl. There were seven sub-events where cyclists competed with other teams in order to earn points; the team with the lowest points after the seven sub-events was declared the winner. Each boy raced in one of Cross Country, Time Trial and BMX while the girl competed in all three events, all three boys also raced in the Road Race. The event was held over the period of four days from 17 to 19 and 22 August 2010. The venues were at Tampines Bike Park for the Cross Country, Boys’ Time Trial and BMX and The Float at Marina Bay for Girls’ Time Trial and the Road Race.

== Medalists ==
Gold	Silver	Bronze
Colombia; Jessica Legarda; Jhonnatan Botero Villegas; Brayan Ramírez; David Oquendo	Italy; Alessia Bulleri; Andrea Righettini; Nicolas Marini; Mattia Furlan	Netherlands; Maartje Hereijgers; Thijs Zuurbier; Friso Roscam Abbing Ijpeij; Twan van Gendt

== Results ==
Rank	Team	Cross Country		Time Trial		BMX		Road Race	Total
Rank	Team	Boys	Girls	Boys	Girls	Boys	Girls	Boys	Total
1st place, gold medalist(s)	Colombia; Jessica Legarda; Jhonnatan Botero Villegas; Brayan Ramírez; David Oquendo	1	40	12	40	1	40	20	154
2nd place, silver medalist(s)	Italy; Alessia Bulleri; Andrea Righettini; Nicolas Marini; Mattia Furlan	10	12	16	21	61	39	12	171
3rd place, bronze medalist(s)	Netherlands; Maartje Hereijgers; Thijs Zuurbier; Friso Roscam Abbing Ijpeij; Twan van Gendt	40	39	24	30	10	8	40	191
4	Belgium; Tori van de Perre; Laurens Sweeck; Boris Vallee; Mattias Somers	17	40	14	40	72	18	−4	197
5	Switzerland; Linda Indergand; Michael Stuenzi; Marc Schaerli; Romain Tanniger	61	5	30	1	45	24	40	206
6	Mexico; Íngrid Drexel; Carlos Moran; Ulises Alfredo Castillo; Christopher Mireles	30	21	30	8	72	40	20	221
7	Denmark; Mette Jepsen; Magnus Nielsen; Michael Andersen; Niklas Laustsen Laustsen	45	40	7	40	17	15	67	231
8	Czech Republic; Karolina Kalasova; Daniel Vesely; Matej Lasak; Jakub Hladik	50	1	30	5	50	40	67	243
9	Portugal; Magda Soraia Fernandes Martins; Joao Tago Cancela Leal; Rafael Ferreira Reis; Rodrigo Jose Jeronimo Gomes	72	30	1	40	72	40	5	260
10	Chile; Laura Minizaga Holloway; Nicolas Prudencio Flano; Edison Bravo Mansilla; Ignacio Cruz Ormeno	58	15	27	15	64	27	56	262
11	Australia; Kirsten Dellar; Michael Baker; Jay McCarthy; Matthew Dunsworth	72	40	4	38	54	5	67	280
12	Poland; Monika Zur; Bartlomiej Wawak; Marek Kulas; Michal Czerkies	25	18	22	40	72	40	67	284
13	Brazil; Mayara Perez; William Alexi; Guilherme Pineyrua; Leandro Miranda	70	40	30	40	40	1	72	293
14	South Africa; Teagan O'Keeffe; Luke Roberts; Jayde Julius; Lunga Mkhize	72	40	30	40	72	12	30	296
15	Slovenia; Nika Kozar; Urban Ferencak; Doron Hekic; Rok Korosec	35	40	30	39	72	40	45	301
16	Japan; Manami Iwade; Idomu Yamamoto; Koji Nagase; Yoshitaku Nagasako	72	32	28	40	30	30	72	304
17	Kazakhstan; Rimma Luchshenko; Vadim Galeyev; Alexy Lutsenko; Nurlan Duisenov	68	38	10	24	72	40	53	305
17	Latvia; Lija Laizāne; Andris Vosekalns; Aleksandrs Kurbatskis; Kristers Taims	72	34	30	27	35	40	67	305
19	Canada; Kristina Laforge; Steven Noble; Ryan Macdonald; Steven Creighton	64	8	20	40	66	37	72	307
20	New Zealand; Sarah Kate McDonald; Sam Shaw; Denay Cottam; Trent Woodcock	72	37	25	12	58	32	72	308
21	Argentina; Verena Brunner; Kevin Ingratta; Facundo Lezica; Lucas Bustos	72	50	26	37	25	40	72	322
22	Spain; Bianca Martin; Antonio Santos; Alvaro Trueba; Ruben Crespo	54	40	29	36	70	40	54	323
23	Cyprus; Antri Christoforou; Leontios Katsouris; Eirinaios Koutsiou; Mamas Kyriacou	72	27	30	18	72	40	72	331
24	Indonesia; Elga Kharisma Novanda; Destian Satria; Ongky Setiawan; Suherman Heryadi	72	36	30	32	72	21	72	335
25	Thailand; Siriluck Christoforou; Satjakul Sianglam; Sarawut Sirironnachai; Jukrapech Wichana	72	24	30	40	72	36	63	337
26	Belarus; Volha Masiukovich; Mikita Zharoven; Kanstantsin Khviyuzan; Pavel Rahel	72	40	18	34	72	40	65	341
27	Serbia; Jovana Crnogorac; Lazar Jovanovic; Filip Pavlovic; Aleksa Velickovic	72	40	30	40	72	40	61	355
28	Bolivia; Jimena Montecinos; Carlos Montellano; Samuel Melgar; Sebastian Vargas	72	40	30	40	68	40	72	357
29	Hungary; Zsofia Keri; Peter Fenyvesi; Ferenc Stuban; Patrik Szoboszlai	66	40	30	40	72	38	72	358
30	Singapore; Nur Nasthasia Abdul Nazzeer; Jun Jie Daniel Koh; Travis Joshua Woodford; Alvin Hui Zhi Phoon	72	40	30	40	72	34	72	360
31	Zimbabwe; Shaylene Brown; Nyasha Lungu; Tyron Mackie; Jonathan Lawrence Thackray	72	40	30	40	72	40	72	366
32	Eritrea; Senait Araya Debesay; Samuel Akelom Gebremedhin; Haben Ghebretinsae; Yonas Kidane Merese	72	55	30	40	72	40	67	376
