= Cycling at the 2010 Summer Youth Olympics – Boys' BMX =

Boys' BMX was part of the cycling at the 2010 Summer Youth Olympics program. The event consisted of a seeding round, then elimination rounds where after three races the top 4 would progress to the next round until the final where only a single race was held. It was held on 19 August 2010 at Tampines Bike Park. This was not an official individual event and therefore medals were not given. However the performance of the athletes provided points towards the Combined Mixed Team event for cycling.

== Seeding Round ==
The seeding round began at approximately 10:00 a.m. (UTC+8) on 19 August at Tampines Bike Park.

Rank	Bib No.	Name	Time	Gap
1	NED 4	Twan van Gendt (NED)	31.201	±0.000
2	DEN 4	Niklas Laustsen Laustsen (DEN)	31.517	+0.316
3	COL 4	David Oquendo (COL)	31.534	+0.333
4	AUS 4	Matthew Dunsworth (AUS)	31.656	+0.455
5	ARG 4	Lucas Bustos (ARG)	31.857	+0.656
6	NZL 4	Trent Woodcock (NZL)	32.181	+0.980
7	JPN 4	Yoshitaku Nagasako (JPN)	32.353	+1.152
8	LAT 4	Kristers Taims (LAT)	32.420	+1.219
9	SUI 4	Romain Tanniger (SUI)	32.582	+1.381
10	CZE 4	Jakub Hladik (CZE)	32.854	+1.653
11	CHI 4	Ignacio Cruz Ormeno (CHI)	32.973	+1.772
12	ITA 4	Mattia Furlan (ITA)	33.045	+1.844
13	BOL 4	Sebastian Vargas (BOL)	33.282	+2.081
14	ESP 4	Ruben Crespo (ESP)	33.491	+2.290
15	BRA 4	Leandro Miranda (BRA)	33.502	+2.301
16	CAN 4	Creighton Steven (CAN)	33.549	+2.348
17	MEX 4	Christopher Mireles (MEX)	33.737	+2.536
18	HUN 4	Patrik Szoboszlai (HUN)	34.168	+2.967
19	BEL 4	Mattias Somers (BEL)	34.371	+3.170
20	RSA 4	Lunga Mkhize (RSA)	35.189	+3.988
21	ZIM 4	Jonathan Lawrence Thackray (ZIM)	35.622	+4.421
22	THA 4	Jukrapech Wichana (THA)	39.661	+8.460
23	SLO 4	Rok Korosec (SLO)	40.957	+9.756
24	KAZ 4	Nurlan Duisenov (KAZ)	42.827	+11.626
25	POL 4	Michal Czerkies (POL)	44.393	+13.192
26	POR 4	Rodrigo Jose Jeronimo Gomes (POR)	46.651	+15.450
27	INA 4	Suherman Heryadi (INA)	48.303	+17.102
28	SRB 4	Aleksa Velickovic (SRB)	49.608	+18.407
29	CYP 4	Mamas Kyriacou (CYP)	51.807	+20.606
30	SIN 4	Alvin Hui Zhi Phoon (SIN)	DNF	
31	BLR 4	Pavel Rahel (BLR)	DNF	
	ERI 4	Yonas Kidane Merese (ERI)	DNS	

== Quarterfinals ==
The quarterfinals began at approximately 1:42 p.m. (UTC+8) on 19 August at Tampines Bike Park.

=== Heat 1 ===
Rank	Bib No.	Name	1st run	2nd run	3rd run	Total	Notes
1	NED 4	Twan van Gendt (NED)	1 (31.313)	1 (31.894)	1 (31.519)	3	Q
2	LAT 4	Kristers Taims (LAT)	3 (32.944)	2 (32.466)	3 (32.387)	8	Q
3	SUI 4	Romain Tanniger (SUI)	4 (32.971)	4 (33.456)	2 (32.383)	10	Q
4	CAN 4	Steven Creighton (CAN)	2 (32.532)	5 (33.999)	4 (34.342)	11	Q
5	MEX 4	Christopher Mireles (MEX)	5 (36.085)	3 (33.243)	5 (36.738)	13	
6	KAZ 4	Nurlan Duisenov (KAZ)	6 (42.216)	6 (43.279)	6 (42.672)	18	
7	POL 4	Michal Czerkies (POL)	7 (44.317)	7 (46.229)	7 (44.281)	21	

=== Heat 2 ===
Rank	Bib No.	Name	1st run	2nd run	3rd run	Total	Notes
1	ARG 4	Lucas Bustos (ARG)	1 (32.103)	1 (32.344)	2 (32.794)	4	Q
2	AUS 4	Matthew Dunsworth (AUS)	2 (32.467)	2 (32.703)	1 (31.959)	5	Q
3	ITA 4	Mattia Furlan (ITA)	3 (32.995)	3 (33.485)	3 (33.671)	9	Q
4	BOL 4	Sebastian Vargas (BOL)	4 (33.690)	4 (33.801)	5 (39.814)	13	Q
5	RSA 4	Lunga Mkhize (RSA)	5 (34.749)	5 (35.075)	4 (37.670)	14	
6	ZIM 4	Jonathan Lawrence Thackray (ZIM)	8 (DNF)	6 (42.651)	6 (39.994)	20	
7	SRB 4	Aleksa Velickovic (SRB)	6 (49.799)	7 (49.413)	7 (50.841)	20	
8	CYP 4	Mamas Kyriacou (CYP)	7 (54.102)	8 (51.795)	8 (51.088)	23	

=== Heat 3 ===
Rank	Bib No.	Name	1st run	2nd run	3rd run	Total	Notes
1	DEN 4	Niklas Laustsen Laustsen (DEN)	1 (36.196)	1 (32.445)	1 (31.823)	3	Q
2	JPN 4	Yoshitaku Nagasako (JPN)	2 (36.726)	2 (33.045)	2 (32.581)	6	Q
3	BRA 4	Leandro Miranda (BRA)	3 (45.018)	4 (34.385)	3 (32.779)	10	Q
4	CZE 4	Jakub Hladik (CZE)	4 (46.707)	3 (33.205)	5 (34.832)	12	Q
5	HUN 4	Patrik Szoboszlai (HUN)	6 (48.199)	5 (34.401)	4 (33.772)	15	
6	SLO 4	Rok Korosec (SLO)	7 (50.313)	6 (41.616)	6 (41.847)	19	
7	POR 4	Rodrigo Jose Jeronimo Gomes (POR)	5 (47.600)	7 (47.837)	7 (47.851)	19	
	BLR 4	Pavel Rahel (BLR)	10 (DNS)	10 (DNS)		DSQ	

=== Heat 4 ===
Rank	Bib No.	Name	1st run	2nd run	3rd run	Total	Notes
1	COL 4	David Oquendo (COL)	1 (31.780)	1 (31.829)	1 (32.791)	3	Q
2	NZL 4	Trent Woodcock (NZL)	2 (32.394)	2 (32.394)	2 (32.792)	6	Q
3	ESP 4	Ruben Crespo (ESP)	4 (34.139)	4 (33.292)	3 (33.114)	11	Q
4	CHI 4	Ignacio Cruz Ormeno (CHI)	5 (34.462)	3 (32.827)	4 (33.447)	12	Q
5	BEL 4	Mattias Somers (BEL)	3 (33.614)	5 (34.313)	5 (34.158)	13	
6	THA 4	Jukrapech Wichana (THA)	6 (38.485)	6 (38.634)	6 (38.533)	18	
7	SIN 4	Alvin Hui Zhi Phoon (SIN)	7 (41.300)	7 (41.459)	7 (41.749)	21	
8	INA 4	Suherman Heryadi (INA)	8 (47.679)	8 (1:03.806)	8 (48.285)	24	

== Semifinals ==
The semifinals began at approximately 3:00 p.m. (UTC+8) on 19 August at Tampines Bike Park.

=== Heat 1 ===
Rank	Bib No.	Name	1st run	2nd run	3rd run	Total	Notes
1	NED 4	Twan van Gendt (NED)	1 (31.192)	1 (31.134)	1 (31.250)	3	Q
2	ARG 4	Lucas Bustos (ARG)	5 (33.105)	2 (31.812)	2 (31.843)	9	Q
3	LAT 4	Kristers Taims (LAT)	4 (32.992)	3 (35.741)	3 (32.542)	10	Q
4	SUI 4	Romain Tanniger (SUI)	2 (32.552)	8 (1:16.465)	4 (33.047)	14	Q
5	AUS 4	Matthew Dunsworth (AUS)	3 (32.693)	6 (52.495)	8 (34.738)	17	
6	ITA 4	Mattia Furlan (ITA)	6 (33.693)	7 (1:07.489)	5 (33.408)	18	
7	CAN 4	Steven Creighton (CAN)	8 (55.939)	4 (40.752)	6 (33.559)	18	
8	BOL 4	Sebastian Vargas (BOL)	7 (34.946)	5 (45.785)	7 (34.012)	19	

=== Heat 2 ===
Rank	Bib No.	Name	1st run	2nd run	3rd run	Total	Notes
1	DEN 4	Niklas Laustsen Laustsen (DEN)	1 (31.662)	1 (32.470)	1 (31.933)	3	Q
2	COL 4	David Oquendo (COL)	2 (32.065)	3 (33.132)	2 (33.442)	7	Q
3	BRA 4	Leandro Miranda (BRA)	4 (32.554)	4 (41.117)	5 (47.069)	13	Q
4	JPN 4	Yoshitaku Nagasako (JPN)	5 (32.907)	2 (32.839)	6 (55.485)	13	Q
5	CZE 4	Jakub Hladik (CZE)	6 (33.314)	5 (42.267)	4 (36.835)	15	
6	NZL 4	Trent Woodcock (NZL)	3 (32.133)	6 (42.466)	7 (DNF)	16	
7	CHI 4	Ignacio Cruz Ormeno (CHI)	7 (1:45.413)	7 (59.575)	3 (36.116)	17	
	ESP 4	Ruben Crespo (ESP)	8 (DNF)	10 (DNS)	10 (DNS)	DSQ	

== Finals ==
The finals began at approximately 4:17 p.m. (UTC+8) on 19 August at Tampines Bike Park.

Rank	Bib No.	Name	Time	Gap
1	COL 4	David Oquendo (COL)	30.965	±0.000
2	NED 4	Twan van Gendt (NED)	31.473	+0.508
3	DEN 4	Niklas Laustsen Laustsen (DEN)	31.743	+0.778
4	ARG 4	Lucas Bustos (ARG)	31.868	+0.903
5	JPN 4	Yoshitaku Nagasako (JPN)	31.938	+0.973
6	LAT 4	Kristers Taims (LAT)	32.329	+1.364
7	BRA 4	Leandro Miranda (BRA)	32.818	+1.853
8	SUI 4	Romain Tanniger (SUI)	33.786	+2.821

== Points ==
Rank	Bib No.	Name	Points
1	COL 4	David Oquendo (COL)	1
2	NED 4	Twan van Gendt (NED)	10
3	DEN 4	Niklas Laustsen Laustsen (DEN)	17
4	ARG 4	Lucas Bustos (ARG)	25
5	JPN 4	Yoshitaku Nagasako (JPN)	30
6	LAT 4	Kristers Taims (LAT)	35
7	BRA 4	Leandro Miranda (BRA)	40
8	SUI 4	Romain Tanniger (SUI)	45
9	CZE 4	Jakub Hladik (CZE)	50
10	AUS 4	Matthew Dunsworth (AUS)	54
11	NZL 4	Trent Woodcock (NZL)	58
12	ITA 4	Mattia Furlan (ITA)	61
13	CHI 4	Ignacio Cruz Ormeno (CHI)	64
14	CAN 4	Steven Creighton (CAN)	66
15	BOL 4	Sebastian Vargas (BOL)	68
16	ESP 4	Ruben Crespo (ESP)	70
17	BEL 4	Mattias Somers (BEL)	72
18	MEX 4	Christopher Mireles (MEX)	72
19	RSA 4	Lunga Mkhize (RSA)	72
20	HUN 4	Patrik Szoboszlai (HUN)	72
21	THA 4	Jukrapech Wichana (THA)	72
22	KAZ 4	Nurlan Duisenov (KAZ)	72
23	SLO 4	Rok Korosec (SLO)	72
24	ZIM 4	Jonathan Lawrence Thackray (ZIM)	72
25	POR 4	Rodrigo Jose Jeronimo Gomes (POR)	72
26	SRB 4	Aleksa Velickovic (SRB)	72
27	SIN 4	Alvin Hui Zhi Phoon (SIN)	72
28	POL 4	Michal Czerkies (POL)	72
29	CYP 4	Mamas Kyriacou (CYP)	72
30	INA 4	Suherman Heryadi (INA)	72
31	BLR 4	Pavel Rahel (BLR)	72
32	ERI 4	Yonas Kidane Merese (ERI)	72
