= Cycling at the 2010 Summer Youth Olympics – Boys' road race =

Boys' road race was part of the cycling at the 2010 Summer Youth Olympics program. The event consisted of five 9.6 kilometres (6.0 mi) laps of cycling at a total distance of 48.0 kilometres (29.8 mi). It was held on 22 August 2010 at The Float at Marina Bay. All three boys from each country team raced in the event. This was not an official individual event and therefore medals were not given. However the performance of the athletes provided points towards the Combined Mixed Team event for cycling.

Only the first place cyclist of each team provided points for the Combined Mixed Team event. However, as an incentive for all three boys to finish the race the team was given a -5 reduction and an extra -10 reduction should they have 2 cyclists in the top 16 overall.

== Results ==
The race began at approximately 11:30 a.m. (UTC+8) on 22 August at The Float at Marina Bay.

Rank	Bib No.	Name	Final Time	Time Behind	Points	Point Reduction
1	BEL 3	Boris Vallee (BEL)	1:05:42	±0:00	1	-5
2	POR 3	Rafael Ferreira Reis (POR)	1:05:44	+0:02	10	-5
3	ITA 3	Nicolas Marini (ITA)	"	"	17	-5
4	MEX 3	Ulises Castillo (MEX)	"	"	25	-5
5	RSA 3	Jayde Julius (RSA)	"	"	30	
6	COL 2	Jhonnatan Botero Villegas (COL)	"	"	35	-15
7	SUI 2	Michael Stuenzi (SUI)	"	"	40	
8	NED 3	Friso Roscam Abbing Ijpeij (NED)	"	"	45	-5
9	SLO 3	Doron Hekic (SLO)	"	"	50	-5
10	ESP 2	Antonio Santos (ESP)	"	"	54	
11	KAZ 2	Vadim Galeyev (KAZ)	"	"	58	-5
12	CHI 3	Edison Bravo Mansilla (CHI)	"	"	61	-5
13	COL 3	Brayan Ramírez (COL)	"	"		
14	SRB 3	Filip Pavlovic (SRB)	"	"	66	-5
15	THA 3	Sarawut Sirironnachai (THA)	"	"	68	-5
16	BLR 2	Mikita Zharoven (BLR)	"	"	70	-5
17	THA 2	Satjakul Sianglam (THA)	"	"		
18	NZL 3	Denay Cottam (NZL)	"	"	72	
19	AUS 3	Jay McCarthy (AUS)	"	"	72	-5
20	MEX 2	Carlos Moran (MEX)	"	"		
21	JPN 3	Koji Nagase (JPN)	"	"	72	
22	SUI 3	Marc Schaerli (SUI)	"	"		
23	KAZ 3	Alexey Lutsenko (KAZ)	"	"		
24	KAZ 4	Nurlan Duisenkov (KAZ)	"	"		
25	POL 3	Marek Kulas (POL)	"	"	72	-5
26	JPN 2	Idomu Yamamoto (JPN)	"	"		
27	CAN 2	Steven Noble (CAN)	"	"	72	
28	POR 2	Joao Tiago Cancela Leal (POR)	"	"		
29	BEL 2	Laurens Sweeck (BEL)	"	"		
30	POL 2	Bartlomiej Wawak (POL)	"	"		
31	INA 4	Suherman Heryadi (INA)	"	"	72	
32	ESP 3	Alvaro Trueba (ESP)	"	"		
33	ITA 2	Andrea Righettini (ITA)	"	"		
34	NED 2	Thijs Zuurbier (NED)	"	"		
35	CZE 2	Daniel Vesely (CZE)	"	"	72	-5
36	HUN 3	Ferenc Stuban (HUN)	"	"	72	
37	BRA 2	William Alexi (BRA)	"	"	72	
38	CYP 2	Leontios Katsouris (CYP)	"	"	72	
39	BLR 3	Kanstantsin Khviyuzau (BLR)	"	"		
40	SRB 4	Aleksa Velickovic (SRB)	"	"		
41	POR 4	Rodrigo Jose Jeronimo Gomes (POR)	"	"		
42	RSA 2	Luke Roberts (RSA)	"	"		
43	AUS 2	Michael Baker (AUS)	"	"		
44	SLO 2	Urban Ferencak (SLO)	"	"		
45	THA 4	Jukrapech Wichana (THA)	"	"		
46	ZIM 2	Nyasha Lungu (ZIM)	"	"	72	
47	HUN 2	Peter Fenyvesi (HUN)	"	"		
48	LAT 2	Andris Vosekalns (LAT)	"	"	72	-5
49	ARG 3	Facundo Lezica (ARG)	"	"	72	
50	DEN 3	Michael Andersen (DEN)	"	"	72	-5
51	ERI 2	Samuel Akelom Gebremedhin (ERI)	1:08:21	+2:39	72	-5
52	CZE 3	Matej Lasak (CZE)	1:11:39	+5:57		
53	ERI 3	Haben Ghebretinsae (ERI)	"	"		
54	SLO 4	Rok Korosec (SLO)	1:12:18	+6:36		
55	CHI 2	Nicolas Prudencio Flano (CHI)	1:14:02	+8:20		
56	CYP 3	Eirinaios Koutsiou (CYP)	"	"		
57	NED 4	Twan van Gendt (NED)	"	"		
58	BOL 2	Carlos Montellano (BOL)	1:14:08	+8:26	72	-5
59	LAT 3	Aleksandrs Kurbatskis (LAT)	1:15:40	+9:58		
60	BLR 4	Pavel Rahel (BLR)	"	"		
61	AUS 4	Matthew Dunsworth (AUS)	1:16:48	+11:06		
62	BRA 4	Leandro Miranda (BRA)	"	"		
63	SRB 2	Lazar Jovanovic (SRB)	"	"		
64	LAT 4	Kristers Taims (LAT)	"	"		
65	BOL 3	Samuel Melgar (BOL)	"	"		
66	BEL 4	Mattias Somers (BEL)	"	"		
67	MEX 4	Christopher Mireles (MEX)	"	"		
68	BOL 4	Sebastian Vargas (BOL)	"	"		
69	COL 4	David Oquendo (COL)	"	"		
70	POL 4	Michal Czerkies (POL)	"	"		
71	SIN 2	Jun Jie Daniel Koh (SIN)	"	"	72	
72	CZE 4	Jakub Hladik (CZE)	"	"		
73	SIN 3	Travis Joshua Woodford (SIN)	"	"		
74	ERI 4	Yonas Kidane Merese (ERI)	1:16:55	+11:13		
75	ZIM 3	Tyron Mackie (ZIM)	1:18:01	+12:19		
76	DEN 4	Niklas Laustsen Laustsen (DEN)	1:19:44	+14:02		
77	DEN 2	Magnus Nielsen (DEN)	"	"		
78	CHI 4	Ignacio Cruz Ormeno (CHI)	1:24:04	+18:22		
79	ITA 4	Mattia Furlan (ITA)	1:34:06	+28:24		
	ARG 2	Kevin Ingratta (ARG)	DNF			
	HUN 4	Patrik Szoboszlai (HUN)	DNF			
	INA 2	Destian Satria (INA)	DNF			
	SIN 4	Alvin Hui Zhi Phoon (SIN)	DNF			
	ZIM 4	Jonathan Lawrence Thackray (ZIM)	DNF			
	NZL 2	Sam Shaw (NZL)	DNF			
	JPN 4	Yoshitaku Nagasako (JPN)	DNF			
	CYP 4	Mamas Kyriacou (CYP)	DNF			
	ARG 4	Lucas Bustos (ARG)	DNF			
	SUI 4	Romain Tanniger (SUI)	DNF			
	CAN 4	Steven Creighton (CAN)	DNF			
	RSA 4	Lunga Mkhize (RSA)	DNF			
	CAN 3	Ryan Macdonald (CAN)	DNF			
	BRA 3	Guilherme Pineyrua (BRA)	DNF			
	INA 3	Ongky Setiawan (INA)	DNF			
	ESP 4	Ruben Crespo (ESP)	DNS			
	NZL 4	Trent Woodcock (NZL)	DNS			
