= Netherlands at the 2010 Summer Youth Olympics =

- IOC code: NED
- NOC: NOC*NSF
- Website: www.nocnsf.nl

in Singapore
- Competitors: 36 in 10 sports
- Flag bearer: Kiran Badloe
- Medals Ranked 38th: Gold 1 Silver 2 Bronze 1 Total 4

Summer Youth Olympics appearances
- 2010; 2014; 2018; 2026

Netherlands participated in the 2010 Summer Youth Olympics in Singapore.

The Dutch squad consisted of 36 athletes competing in 10 sports: aquatics (swimming), archery, badminton, cycling, gymnastics, field hockey, judo, rowing, sailing and table tennis.

== Medalists ==
Medal	Name	Sport	Event	Date
Gold	Netherlands Girls' Field Hockey team: Roos Broek; Lara Dell'Anna; Frederique Derkx; Saskia van Duivenboden; Jet de Graeff; Juliette van Hattum; Mathilde Hotting; Marloes Keetels; Lisanne de Lange; Liselotte van Mens; Elsie Nix; Floor Ouwerling; Floortje Plokker; Macey de Ruiter; Lisa Scheerlinck; Lieke van Wijk	Field hockey	Girls' tournament	24 Aug
Silver	Rick van den Oever	Archery	Boys' individual	21 Aug
Silver	Daphne van der Vaart	Sailing	Byte CII - Girls' One Person Dinghy	25 Aug
Bronze	Thijs Zuurbier; Maartje Hereijgers; Friso Roscam Abbing Ijpeij; Twan van Gendt	Cycling	Combined mixed team	22 Aug

== Archery ==
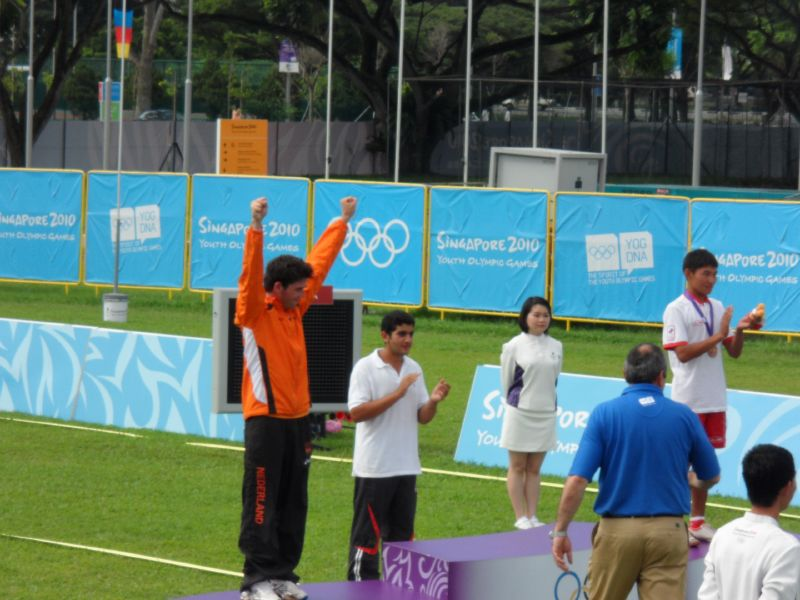
Rick van den Oever on the victory podium after winning the silver medal in the Junior Men's Individual archery competition on 21 August 2010 at Kallang Field, Singapore

Boys

Athlete	Event	Ranking Round		Round of 32	Round of 16	Quarterfinals	Semifinals	Final	
Athlete	Event	Score	Seed	Opposition Score	Opposition Score	Opposition Score	Opposition Score	Opposition Score	Rank
Rick van den Oever	Boys’ Individual	653	1	Farjat (MEX); W 6-2	Rivas (ESP); W 6-0	Nott (AUS); W 6-4	Tsybzhitov (RUS); W 6-4	Sabry (EGY); L 0-6	Silver medal

Girls

Athlete	Event	Ranking Round		Round of 32	Round of 16	Quarterfinals	Semifinals	Final	
Athlete	Event	Score	Seed	Opposition Score	Opposition Score	Opposition Score	Opposition Score	Opposition Score	Rank
Maud Custers	Girls’ Individual	594	16	Lecointre (FRA); W 6-0	Kwak (KOR); L 1-7	Did not advance			9

Mixed Team

Athlete	Event	Partner	Round of 32	Round of 16	Quarterfinals	Semifinals	Final	
Athlete	Event	Partner	Opposition Score	Opposition Score	Opposition Score	Opposition Score	Opposition Score	Rank
Rick van den Oever	Mixed Team	Aya Kamel (EGY)	Safitri (INA)/ Komonyuk (UKR); W 6-5	Ingley (AUS)/ Koiwa (JPN); L 3-7	Did not advance			9
Maud Custers	Mixed Team	Vasil Shahnazaryan (ARM)	Leek (USA)/ Das (IND); W 6-4	Paraskevopoulou (GRE)/ Rajh (SLO); L 4-6	Did not advance			9

== Badminton ==
Boys

Athlete	Event	Group Stage				Knock-Out Stage			
Athlete	Event	Match 1	Match 2	Match 3	Rank	Quarterfinal	Semifinal	Final	Rank
Nick Fransman	Boys’ Singles	Belarbi (ALG) W 2-0 (21-14, 21-16)	Huang (CHN) L 0-2 (11-21, 14-21)	Elsayad (EGY) L 0-2 (16-21, 19-21)	3	Did not advance			

Girls

Athlete	Event	Group Stage				Knock-Out Stage			
Athlete	Event	Match 1	Match 2	Match 3	Rank	Quarterfinal	Semifinal	Final	Rank
Josephine Wentholt	Girls’ Singles	Matsutomo (JPN) W 2-1 (21-17, 5-21, 21-19)	Wong (CAN) W 2-0 (21-15, 21-8)	Kune (MRI) W 2-0 (21-7, 21-12)	1 Q	Milne (GBR) L 0-2 (15-21, 8-21)	Did not advance		=5

== Cycling ==
Cross Country

Athlete	Event	Time	Rank	Points
Thijs Zuurbier	Boys’ Cross Country	1:01:37	7	40
Maartje Hereijgers	Girls’ Cross Country	56:17	16	39

Time Trial

Athlete	Event	Time	Rank	Points
Friso Roscam Abbing Ijpeij	Boys’ Time Trial	4:10.05	11	24
Maartje Hereijgers	Girls’ Time Trial	3:36.37	10	30

BMX

Athlete	Event	Seeding Round		Quarterfinals							Semifinals							Final		
Athlete	Event	Seeding Round		Run 1		Run 2		Run 3		Rank	Run 1		Run 2		Run 3		Rank	Final		
Athlete	Event	Time	Rank	Time	Rank	Time	Rank	Time	Rank	Rank	Time	Rank	Time	Rank	Time	Rank	Rank	Time	Rank	Points
Twan van Gendt	Boys’ BMX	31.201	1	31.313	1	31.894	1	31.519	1	1 Q	31.192	1	31.134	1	31.250	1	1 Q	31.473	2	10
Maartje Hereijgers	Girls’ BMX	37.250	3	37.925	1	38.056	1	38.146	1	1 Q	38.277	2	36.851	1	37.034	1	1 Q	36.457	3	8

Road Race

Athlete	Event	Time	Rank	Points
Friso Roscam Abbing Ijpeij	Boys’ Road Race	1:05:44	8	40*
Thijs Zuurbier	Boys’ Road Race	1:05:44	34	
Twan van Gendt	Boys’ Road Race	1:14:02	57	

Overall

Team	Event	Cross Country Pts		Time Trial Pts		BMX Pts		Road Race Pts	Total	Rank
Team	Event	Boys	Girls	Boys	Girls	Boys	Girls	Road Race Pts	Total	Rank
Maartje Hereijgers; Thijs Zuurbier; Friso Roscam Abbing Ijpeij; Twan van Gendt	Mixed Team	40	39	24	30	10	8	40*	191	Bronze medal

- * Received -5 for finishing road race with all three racers

== Gymnastics ==
=== Artistic Gymnastics ===
Boys

Athlete	Event	Floor		Pommel Horse		Rings		Vault		Parallel Bars		Horizontal Bar		Total	
Athlete	Event	Score	Rank	Score	Rank	Score	Rank	Score	Rank	Score	Rank	Score	Rank	Score	Rank
Karl Kosztka	Boys' Qualification	13.750	16	11.200	36	13.100	27	14.800	29	11.650	36	12.400	33	76.900	34

Girls

Athlete	Event	Vault		Uneven Bars		Beam		Floor		Total	
Athlete	Event	Score	Rank	Score	Rank	Score	Rank	Score	Rank	Score	Rank
Tess Moonen	Girls' Qualification	13.800	5	13.800	4 Q	13.450	12	13.200	7 Q	54.250	5 Q
Tess Moonen	Girls' Individual All-Around	13.600	10	13.450	4	13.050	12	13.100	11	53.200	8

Athlete	Event	Score	Rank
Tess Moonen	Girls' Uneven Bars	12.725	5
Tess Moonen	Girls' Floor	13.575	6

=== Trampoline ===
Athlete	Event	Qualification				Final	
Athlete	Event	Routine 1	Routine 2	Total	Rank	Routine 1	Rank
Denis Liefting	Girls' Trampoline	25.800	29.900	55.700	10	Did not advance	

== Field hockey ==
Squad List	Event	Group Stage		Final	
Squad List	Event	Opposition Score	Rank	Opposition Score	Rank
Saskia van Duivenboden; Lieke van Wijk; Lisa Scheerlinck; Lisanne de Lange; Jet de Graeff; Floor Ouwerling; Liselotte van Mens; Lara Dell'Anna; Roos Broek; Floortje Plokker; Marloes Keetels (C); Macey de Ruiter; Frederique Derkx; Elsie Nix; Mathilde Hotting; Juliette van Hattum	Girls' Hockey	(Republic of Ireland) Ireland; W 3-1	2	Argentina; W 2-1	Gold medal
Saskia van Duivenboden; Lieke van Wijk; Lisa Scheerlinck; Lisanne de Lange; Jet de Graeff; Floor Ouwerling; Liselotte van Mens; Lara Dell'Anna; Roos Broek; Floortje Plokker; Marloes Keetels (C); Macey de Ruiter; Frederique Derkx; Elsie Nix; Mathilde Hotting; Juliette van Hattum	Girls' Hockey	South Africa; W 13-0	2	Argentina; W 2-1	Gold medal
Saskia van Duivenboden; Lieke van Wijk; Lisa Scheerlinck; Lisanne de Lange; Jet de Graeff; Floor Ouwerling; Liselotte van Mens; Lara Dell'Anna; Roos Broek; Floortje Plokker; Marloes Keetels (C); Macey de Ruiter; Frederique Derkx; Elsie Nix; Mathilde Hotting; Juliette van Hattum	Girls' Hockey	New Zealand; W 1-0	2	Argentina; W 2-1	Gold medal
Saskia van Duivenboden; Lieke van Wijk; Lisa Scheerlinck; Lisanne de Lange; Jet de Graeff; Floor Ouwerling; Liselotte van Mens; Lara Dell'Anna; Roos Broek; Floortje Plokker; Marloes Keetels (C); Macey de Ruiter; Frederique Derkx; Elsie Nix; Mathilde Hotting; Juliette van Hattum	Girls' Hockey	Argentina; T 2-2	2	Argentina; W 2-1	Gold medal
Saskia van Duivenboden; Lieke van Wijk; Lisa Scheerlinck; Lisanne de Lange; Jet de Graeff; Floor Ouwerling; Liselotte van Mens; Lara Dell'Anna; Roos Broek; Floortje Plokker; Marloes Keetels (C); Macey de Ruiter; Frederique Derkx; Elsie Nix; Mathilde Hotting; Juliette van Hattum	Girls' Hockey	South Korea; T 2-2	2	Argentina; W 2-1	Gold medal

== Judo ==
Individual

Athlete	Event	Round 1	Round 2	Round 3	Semifinals	Final	Rank
Athlete	Event	Opposition Result	Opposition Result	Opposition Result	Opposition Result	Opposition Result	Rank
Laura Prince	Girls' -52 kg	Ri (PRK); L 000-010	Repechage; Krisandova (SVK); W 001-000	Repechage; Wu (TPE); W 010-001	Repechage; Geldybayeva (TKM); W 011-010	Bronze Medal Match; Huck (AUT); L 000-011	5

== Rowing ==
Athlete	Event	Heats		Repechage		Semifinals		Final		Overall Rank
Athlete	Event	Time	Rank	Time	Rank	Time	Rank	Time	Rank	Overall Rank
Bastiaan Vervoort	Boys' Single Sculls	3:31.07	5 QR	3:34.77	2 QA/B	3:36.58	6 QB	3:26.20	5	11
Annick Taselaar	Girls' Single Sculls	3:48.57	2 QR	3:57.11	2 QA/B	3:54.45	3 QA	3:52.08	5	5

== Sailing ==
One Person Dinghy

Athlete	Event	Race												Points	Rank
Athlete	Event	1	2	3	4	5	6	7	8	9	10	11	M*	Points	Rank
Daphne van der Vaart	Girls' Byte CII	2	5	16	~~21~~	~~RAF~~	5	3	1	1	2	4	2	41	Silver medal

Windsurfing

Athlete	Event	Race											Points	Rank
Athlete	Event	1	2	3	4	5	6	7	8	9	10	M*	Points	Rank
Kiran Badloe	Boys' Techno 293	13	19	~~DNF~~	DNS	9	19	10	12	DNC	DNC	16	164	19

== Swimming ==
Athletes	Event	Heat		Semifinal		Final	
Athletes	Event	Time	Position	Time	Position	Time	Position
Dion Dreesens	Boys’ 100m Freestyle	52.38	24	Did not advance			
Dion Dreesens	Boys’ 200m Freestyle	1:51.90	8 Q			1:51.76	7
Manon Minneboo	Girls’ 50m Freestyle	26.44	7 Q	26.25	7 Q	26.35	8
Manon Minneboo	Girls’ 100m Freestyle	58.77	22			Did not advance	

== Table tennis ==
Individual

Athlete	Event	Round 1		Round 2		Quarterfinals	Semifinals	Final	Rank
Athlete	Event	Group Matches	Rank	Group Matches	Rank	Quarterfinals	Semifinals	Final	Rank
Koen Hageraats	Boys' Singles	Holikov (UZB); W 3-2 (12-10, 11-8, 7-11, 9-11, 11-4)	2 Q	Niwa (JPN); L 0-3 (3-11, 6-11, 2-11)	4	Did not advance			13
Koen Hageraats	Boys' Singles	Gauzy (FRA); L 1-3 (9-11, 12-14, 11-5, 7-11)	2 Q	Kim (KOR); L 0-3 (5-11, 7-11, 13-15)	4	Did not advance			13
Koen Hageraats	Boys' Singles	Jouti (BRA); W 3-2 (11-7, 9-11, 11-9, 9-11, 11-5)	2 Q	Lakatos (HUN); L 1-3 (7-11, 11-7, 5-11, 3-11)	4	Did not advance			13
Britt Eerland	Girls' Singles	Giardi (SMR); W 3-0 (11-3, 11-6, 11-2)	1 Q	Kumahara (BRA); W 3-0 (11-9, 11-8, 11-5)	3	Did not advance			9
Britt Eerland	Girls' Singles	Szocs (ROU); W 3-1 (8-11, 11-7, 11-7, 11-9)	1 Q	Sawettabut (THA); L 2-3 (11-7, 4-11, 10-12, 11-9, 6-11)	3	Did not advance			9
Britt Eerland	Girls' Singles	Baravok (BLR); W 3-0 (11-5, 11-6, 11-5)	1 Q	Bliznet (MDA); L 0-3 (7-11, 4-11, 9-11)	3	Did not advance			9

Team

Athlete	Event	Round 1		Round 2	Quarterfinals	Semifinals	Final	Rank
Athlete	Event	Group Matches	Rank	Round 2	Quarterfinals	Semifinals	Final	Rank
Netherlands; Britt Eerland (NED); Koen Hageraats (NED)	Mixed Team	Pan America 3 Rosheuvel (GUY); Tapia (ECU); W 3-0 (3-0, 3-1, 3-0)	3 qB	Intercontinental 4 Giardi (SMR); Massah (MAW); L 0-2 (wd)	Did not advance			25
Netherlands; Britt Eerland (NED); Koen Hageraats (NED)	Mixed Team	Intercontinental 1 Gu (CHN); Hmam (TUN); L 1-2 (0-3, 3-1, 1-3)	3 qB	Intercontinental 4 Giardi (SMR); Massah (MAW); L 0-2 (wd)	Did not advance			25
Netherlands; Britt Eerland (NED); Koen Hageraats (NED)	Mixed Team	DPR Korea; Kim (PRK); Kim (PRK); L 1-2 (0-3, 3-1, 1-3)	3 qB	Intercontinental 4 Giardi (SMR); Massah (MAW); L 0-2 (wd)	Did not advance			25
