= Mexico at the 2010 Summer Youth Olympics =

- IOC code: MEX
- NOC: Comité Olímpico Mexicano

in Singapore
- Competitors: 42 in 16 sports
- Flag bearer: Iván García
- Medals Ranked 66th: Gold 0 Silver 1 Bronze 5 Total 6

Summer Youth Olympics appearances (overview)
- 2010; 2014; 2018; 2026

Mexico participated in the 2010 Summer Youth Olympics in Singapore.

The Mexico team included 42 athletes competing in 16 sports.

== Medalists ==
| Medal | Name | Sport | Event | Date |
|---|---|---|---|---|
| Silver | Briseida Acosta | Taekwondo | Women's +63kg | 19 Aug |
| Bronze | Alejandro Valdés | Taekwondo | Men's 63kg | 17 Aug |
| Bronze | Aremi Fuentes | Weightlifting | Women's 63kg | 17 Aug |
| Bronze | Adriana Barraza | Triathlon | Mixed Relay | 19 Aug |
| Bronze | Jorge Camacho | Modern Pentathlon | Boys' Individual | 22 Aug |
| Bronze | Pedro Castañeda | Canoeing | C1 Head to head Canoe Sprint Men | 22 Aug |
| Bronze | Ivan Garcia | Diving | Youth Men's 10m Platform | 24 Aug |

== Archery ==
Boys

| Athlete | Event | Ranking Round | | Round of 32 | Round of 16 | Quarterfinals | Semifinals | Final | |
| Athlete | Event | Score | Seed | Opposition Score | Opposition Score | Opposition Score | Opposition Score | Opposition Score | Rank |
|---|---|---|---|---|---|---|---|---|---|
| Jafet Farjat | Boys’ Individual | 312 | 32 | Oever (NED); L 2-6 | Did not advance | | | | 17 |

Girls

| Athlete | Event | Ranking Round | | Round of 32 | Round of 16 | Quarterfinals | Semifinals | Final | |
| Athlete | Event | Score | Seed | Opposition Score | Opposition Score | Opposition Score | Opposition Score | Opposition Score | Rank |
|---|---|---|---|---|---|---|---|---|---|
| Mariana Avitia | Girls’ Individual | 637 | 4 | Ray (BAN); W 6-0 | Alarcón (ESP); W 7-1 | Gobbles (BEL); W 6-2 | Kwak (KOR); L 4-6 | Bronze Medal Match; Segina (RUS); L 2-6 | 4 |

Mixed Team

| Athlete | Event | Partner | Round of 32 | Round of 16 | Quarterfinals | Semifinals | Final | |
| Athlete | Event | Partner | Opposition Score | Opposition Score | Opposition Score | Opposition Score | Opposition Score | Rank |
|---|---|---|---|---|---|---|---|---|
| Jafet Farjat | Mixed Team | Elizabeth Cheok (SIN) | Song (CHN)/ Pianesi (ITA); L 0-6 | Did not advance | | | | 17 |
| Mariana Avitia | Mixed Team | Joni Hautamaki (FIN) | Okubo (JPN)/ Ku (TPE); L 0-6 | Did not advance | | | | 17 |

== Athletics ==
=== Boys ===
Track and Road Events

| Athletes | Event | Qualification | | Final | |
| Athletes | Event | Result | Rank | Result | Rank |
|---|---|---|---|---|---|
| Hector Ruiz | Boys’ 100m | 11.05 | 11 qB | 10.87 | 10 |
| César Ramírez | Boys’ 110m Hurdles | DSQ qC | | 14.03 | 13 |
| Jesus Vega | Boys’ 10km Walk | | | 46:08.16 | 7 |

Field Events

| Athletes | Event | Qualification | | Final | |
| Athletes | Event | Result | Rank | Result | Rank |
|---|---|---|---|---|---|
| Diego Del Real | Boys’ Hammer Throw | 66.44 | 10 qB | 69.66 | 9 |

=== Girls ===
Track and Road Events

| Athletes | Event | Qualification | | Final | |
| Athletes | Event | Result | Rank | Result | Rank |
|---|---|---|---|---|---|
| Yanelli Caballero | Girls’ 5km Walk | | | 22:42.15 | 5 |

Field Events

| Athletes | Event | Qualification | | Final | |
| Athletes | Event | Result | Rank | Result | Rank |
|---|---|---|---|---|---|
| Ivonne Rangel | Girls’ Triple Jump | 12.07 | 9 qB | 12.31 | 9 |
| Tiziana Ruiz | Girls’ Pole Vault | 3.50 | 13 qB | 3.45 | 10 |

== Badminton ==
Boys

| Athlete | Event | Group Stage | | | | Knock-Out Stage | | | |
| Athlete | Event | Match 1 | Match 2 | Match 3 | Rank | Quarterfinal | Semifinal | Final | Rank |
|---|---|---|---|---|---|---|---|---|---|
| Job Castillo | Boys’ Singles | Kang (KOR) L 0-2 (12-21, 17-21) | Lam (USA) W 2-0 (21-18, 21-9) | Chongo (ZAM) W 2-0 (21-14, 21-10) | 2 | Did not advance | | | |

Girls

| Athlete | Event | Group Stage | | | | Knock-Out Stage | | | |
| Athlete | Event | Match 1 | Match 2 | Match 3 | Rank | Quarterfinal | Semifinal | Final | Rank |
|---|---|---|---|---|---|---|---|---|---|
| Mariana Ugalde | Girls’ Singles | Cheah (MAS) L 0-2 (14-21, 9-21) | Tunali (TUR) L 0-2 (11-21, 18-21) | Azeez (NGR) W 2-0 (21-19, 21-14) | 3 | Did not advance | | | |

== Boxing ==
Boys

| Athlete | Event | Preliminaries | Semifinals | Final | Rank |
|---|---|---|---|---|---|
| Daniel Echeverria | Lightweight (60kg) | | Brett Mather (AUS); L 7-8 | 3rd Place Bout; Krishan Vikas (IND); L DSQ R3 0:58 | 4 |

== Canoeing ==
Boys

| Athlete | Event | Time Trial | | Round 1 | Round 2 (Rep) | Round 3 | Round 4 | Round 5 | Final | Rank |
| Athlete | Event | Time | Rank | Round 1 | Round 2 (Rep) | Round 3 | Round 4 | Round 5 | Final | Rank |
|---|---|---|---|---|---|---|---|---|---|---|
| Pedro Castaneda | Boys’ C1 Slalom | DSQ | | Did not advance | | | | | | |
| Pedro Castaneda | Boys’ C1 Sprint | 1:46.64 | 6 | Wang (CHN); W 1:48.37-2:05.51 | | Kutsev (AZE); W 1:49.45-1:54.97 | Queiroz (BRA); W 1:49.74-1:53.21 | Melnyk (UKR); L 1:51.20-1:51.11 | Liferi (ROU); W 1:53.45-1:54.24 | Bronze medal |

== Cycling ==
Cross Country

| Athlete | Event | Time | Rank | Points |
|---|---|---|---|---|
| Carlos Moran | Boys’ Cross Country | 1:01:01 | 5 | 30 |
| Íngrid Drexel | Girls’ Cross Country | 51:55 | 7 | 21 |

Time Trial

| Athlete | Event | Time | Rank | Points |
|---|---|---|---|---|
| Ulises Alfredo Castillo | Boys’ Time Trial | 4:17.82 | 18 | 30 |
| Íngrid Drexel | Girls’ Time Trial | 3:25.37 | 3 | 8 |

BMX

| Athlete | Event | Seeding Round | | Quarterfinals | | | | | | | Semifinals | | | | | | | Final | | |
| Athlete | Event | Seeding Round | | Run 1 | | Run 2 | | Run 3 | | Rank | Run 1 | | Run 2 | | Run 3 | | Rank | Final | | |
| Athlete | Event | Time | Rank | Time | Rank | Time | Rank | Time | Rank | Rank | Time | Rank | Time | Rank | Time | Rank | Rank | Time | Rank | Points |
|---|---|---|---|---|---|---|---|---|---|---|---|---|---|---|---|---|---|---|---|---|
| Christopher Mireles | Boys’ BMX | 33.737 | 17 | 36.085 | 5 | 33.243 | 3 | 36.738 | 5 | 5 | Did not advance | | | | | | | | | 72 |
| Íngrid Drexel | Girls’ BMX | 44.350 | 13 | 43.267 | 4 | 43.826 | 5 | 48.147 | 6 | 5 | Did not advance | | | | | | | | | 40 |

Road Race

| Athlete | Event | Time | Rank | Points |
|---|---|---|---|---|
| Ulises Castillo | Boys’ Road Race | 1:05:44 | 4 | 20* |
| Carlos Moran | Boys’ Road Race | 1:05:44 | 20 | |
| Christopher Mireles | Boys’ Road Race | 1:16:48 | 67 | |

Overall

| Team | Event | Cross Country Pts | | Time Trial Pts | | BMX Pts | | Road Race Pts | Total | Rank |
| Team | Event | Boys | Girls | Boys | Girls | Boys | Girls | Road Race Pts | Total | Rank |
|---|---|---|---|---|---|---|---|---|---|---|
| Íngrid Drexel; Carlos Moran; Ulises Castillo; Christopher Mireles | Mixed Team | 30 | 21 | 30 | 8 | 72 | 40 | 20* | 221 | 6 |

- * Received -5 for finishing road race with all three racers

== Diving ==
Boys

| Athlete | Event | Preliminary | | Final | |
| Athlete | Event | Points | Rank | Points | Rank |
|---|---|---|---|---|---|
| Iván García | Boys’ 3m Springboard | 443.80 | 12 Q | 497.80 | 11 |
| Iván García | Boys’ 10m Platform | 505.55 | 3 Q | 515.70 | Bronze medal |

Girls

| Athlete | Event | Preliminary | | Final | |
| Athlete | Event | Points | Rank | Points | Rank |
|---|---|---|---|---|---|
| Teresa Vallejo | Girls’ 3m Springboard | 360.35 | 7 Q | 348.90 | 11 |
| Teresa Vallejo | Girls’ 10m Platform | 361.20 | 8 Q | 355.10 | 9 |

== Gymnastics ==
=== Artistic Gymnastics ===
Boys

| Athlete | Event | Floor | | Pommel Horse | | Rings | | Vault | | Parallel Bars | | Horizontal Bar | | Total | |
| Athlete | Event | Score | Rank | Score | Rank | Score | Rank | Score | Rank | Score | Rank | Score | Rank | Score | Rank |
|---|---|---|---|---|---|---|---|---|---|---|---|---|---|---|---|
| Javier Cervantes | Boys' Qualification | 12.700 | 32 | 12.150 | 28 | 13.550 | 18 | 15.800 | 4 Q | 12.500 | 28 | 12.500 | 30 | 79.200 | 30 |

| Athlete | Event | Score | Rank |
|---|---|---|---|
| Javier Cervantes | Boys' Vault | 14.850 | 7 |

Girls

| Athlete | Event | Vault | | Uneven Bars | | Beam | | Floor | | Total | |
| Athlete | Event | Score | Rank | Score | Rank | Score | Rank | Score | Rank | Score | Rank |
|---|---|---|---|---|---|---|---|---|---|---|---|
| Karla Salazar | Girls' Qualification | 13.200 | 22 | 12.200 | 18 | 13.300 | 13 | 0.000 | 42 | 38.700 | 40 |

=== Rhythmic Gymnastics ===
Individual

| Athlete | Event | Qualification | | | | | | Final | | | | | |
| Athlete | Event | Rope | Hoop | Ball | Clubs | Total | Rank | Rope | Hoop | Ball | Clubs | Total | Rank |
|---|---|---|---|---|---|---|---|---|---|---|---|---|---|
| Isha Elienai Sanchez Hernandez | Girls' Individual All-Around | 20.725 | 19.875 | 19.250 | 19.350 | 79.200 | 17 | Did not advance | | | | | |

== Judo ==
Individual

| Athlete | Event | Round 1 | Round 2 | Round 3 | Semifinals | Final | Rank |
| Athlete | Event | Opposition Result | Opposition Result | Opposition Result | Opposition Result | Opposition Result | Rank |
|---|---|---|---|---|---|---|---|
| Fernando Vanoye | Boys' -100 kg | BYE | Piepke (GER); L 000-001 | Repechage; Toktogonov (KGZ); L 001-101 | Did not advance | | 9 |

Team

| Team | Event | Round 1 | Round 2 | Semifinals | Final | Rank |
| Team | Event | Opposition Result | Opposition Result | Opposition Result | Opposition Result | Rank |
|---|---|---|---|---|---|---|
| Paris; Barbara Batizi (HUN); Patrick Marxer (LIE); Maja Rasinska (POL); Farshid Ghasemi Asl (IRI); Sophina Arrey (CMR); Khasan Khalmurzaev (RUS); Sana Khelifi (ALG); Fernando Vanoye (MEX) | Mixed Team | Tokyo; L 3-5 | Did not advance | | | 9 |

== Modern pentathlon ==
| Athlete | Event | Fencing (Épée One Touch) | | | Swimming (200m Freestyle) | | | Running & Shooting (3000m, Laser Pistol) | | | Total Points | Final Rank |
| Athlete | Event | Results | Rank | Points | Time | Rank | Points | Time | Rank | Points | Total Points | Final Rank |
|---|---|---|---|---|---|---|---|---|---|---|---|---|
| Jorge Camacho | Boys' Individual | 16-7 | 3 | 1000 | 2:13.28 | 16 | 1204 | 11:04.05 | 5 | 2344 | 4548 | Bronze medal |
| Tamara Vega | Girls' Individual | 10-13 | 13 | 760 | 2:24.07 | 10 | 1072 | 12:39.30 | 5 | 1964 | 3796 | 9 |
| Emily Greenan (IRL); Jorge Camacho (MEX) | Mixed Relay | 55-37 | 4 | 910 | 2:06.35 | 13 | 1284 | 16:11.37 | 12 | 2196 | 4390 | 10 |
| Tamara Vega (MEX); Eric Kruger (GER) | Mixed Relay | 49-43 | 8 | 850 | 2:07.95 | 17 | 1268 | 15:23.66 | 4 | 2388 | 4506 | 5 |

== Sailing ==
Windsurfing

| Athlete | Event | Race | | | | | | | | | | | Points | Rank |
| Athlete | Event | 1 | 2 | 3 | 4 | 5 | 6 | 7 | 8 | 9 | 10 | M* | Points | Rank |
|---|---|---|---|---|---|---|---|---|---|---|---|---|---|---|
| Jose Davila | Boys' Techno 293 | ~~RAF~~ | 16 | 4 | 11 | 14 | 12 | 11 | 16 | 12 | 16 | 18 | 130 | 14 |
| Diana Valera | Girls' Techno 293 | 13 | 13 | ~~15~~ | 11 | 15 | 7 | 13 | 13 | 13 | 13 | 13 | 124 | 12 |

== Shooting ==
Pistol

| Athlete | Event | Qualification | | Final | | |
| Athlete | Event | Score | Rank | Score | Total | Rank |
|---|---|---|---|---|---|---|
| Julio Nava | Boys' 10m Air Pistol | 559 | 14 | Did not advance | | |
| Mariana Nava | Girls' 10m Air Pistol | 366 | 17 | Did not advance | | |

Rifle

| Athlete | Event | Qualification | | | Final | | |
| Athlete | Event | Score | Shoot-Off | Rank | Score | Total | Rank |
|---|---|---|---|---|---|---|---|
| Erick Arzate Marchan | Boys' 10m Air Rifle | 587 | 52.1 | 7 Q | 101.4 | 688.4 | 6 |
| Isamar Guerrero | Girls' 10m Air Rifle | 385 | | 17 | Did not advance | | |

== Swimming ==
| Athletes | Event | Heat | | Semifinal | | Final | |
| Athletes | Event | Time | Position | Time | Position | Time | Position |
|---|---|---|---|---|---|---|---|
| Lourdes Villasenor | Girls’ 100m Backstroke | 1:06.29 | 23 | Did not advance | | | |
| Lourdes Villasenor | Girls’ 200m Backstroke | 2:21.77 | 21 | | | Did not advance | |

== Taekwondo ==
| Athlete | Event | Preliminary | Quarterfinal | Semifinal | Final | Rank |
|---|---|---|---|---|---|---|
| Alejandro Valdés | Boys' -63kg | Taha Madnini (LBA); W 8-7 | Konstantin Minin (RUS); W 8-6 | Beyong Deok Seo (KOR); L 0-5 | Did not advance | Bronze medal |
| Jose Ramos | Boys' +73kg | | Yazan Alsadeq (JOR); L 5-6 | Did not advance | | 5 |
| Monica Chavez | Girls' -55kg | BYE | Jade Jones (GBR); L 4-7 | Did not advance | | 5 |
| Ana Perez | Girls' -63kg | BYE | Nagore Irigoien (ESP); L 4-5 | Did not advance | | 5 |
| Briseida Acosta | Girls' +63kg | BYE | Olga Ivanova (RUS); W 12-7 | Faiza Taoussara (FRA); W 7+-7 | Zheng Shuyin (CHN); L 1-2 | Silver medal |

== Triathlon ==
Girls

| Triathlete | Event | Swimming | Transit 1 | Cycling | Transit 2 | Running | Total time | Rank |
|---|---|---|---|---|---|---|---|---|
| Adriana Barraza | Individual | 10:02 | 0:35 | 31:41 | 0:23 | 19:07 | 1:01:48.57 | 4 |

Men's

| Athlete | Event | Swim (1.5 km) | Trans 1 | Bike (40 km) | Trans 2 | Run (10 km) | Total | Rank |
|---|---|---|---|---|---|---|---|---|
| Luis Oliveros | Individual | 8:59 | 0:31 | 29:47 | 0:27 | 17:22 | 57:06.35 | 13 |

Mixed

| Athlete | Event | Total Times per Athlete (Swim 250 m, Bike 7 km, Run 1.7 km) | Total Group Time | Rank |
|---|---|---|---|---|
| Kelly Whitley (USA); Kevin McDowell (USA); Adriana Barraza (MEX); Lautaro Diaz (ARG) | Mixed Team Relay; Americas 1 | 20:22; 18:29; 21:44; 19:23 | 1:19:58.88 | Bronze medal |
| Christine Ridenour (CAN); Luis Oliveros (MEX); Andrea Longueira (CHI); Juan Andrade (ECU) | Mixed Team Relay; Americas 2 | 20:21; 18:47; 23:07; 20:15 | 1:22:30.15 | 5 |

== Weightlifting ==
| Athlete | Event | Snatch | Clean & Jerk | Total | Rank |
|---|---|---|---|---|---|
| Moises Sotelo | Boys' +85kg | 132 | 157 | 289 | 6 |
| Aremi Fuentes | Girls' 63kg | 88 | 106 | 194 | Bronze medal |

== Wrestling ==
Greco-Roman

| Athlete | Event | Pools | | Final | Rank |
| Athlete | Event | Groups | Rank | Final | Rank |
|---|---|---|---|---|---|
| Pedro Ramirez Camarillo | Boys' 58kg | Lytvynov (UKR); L 1–2 (2–0, 1–1+, 1-1+) | 3 | 5th Place Match; Kranitz (HUN); W 2–1 (1–0, 1-5, 7–4) | 5 |
| Pedro Ramirez Camarillo | Boys' 58kg | Gregory (RSA); W 2–1 (6–0, 1-3, 3–0) | 3 | 5th Place Match; Kranitz (HUN); W 2–1 (1–0, 1-5, 7–4) | 5 |
| Pedro Ramirez Camarillo | Boys' 58kg | Suleymanov (RUS); L 0–2 (1–4, 0–1) | 3 | 5th Place Match; Kranitz (HUN); W 2–1 (1–0, 1-5, 7–4) | 5 |
