= Portugal at the 2010 Summer Youth Olympics =

- IOC code: POR
- NOC: Olympic Committee of Portugal
- Website: www.comiteolimpicoportugal.pt

in Singapore
- Competitors: 19 in 10 sports
- Flag bearer: Mario Silva
- Medals Ranked 70th: Gold 0 Silver 1 Bronze 1 Total 2

Summer Youth Olympics appearances
- 2010; 2014; 2018

Portugal was represented at the 2010 Summer Youth Olympics, held in Singapore from 14 to 26 August 2010, with a delegation of 19 competitors, who took part in 10 sports.

The country won two medals, a silver in taekwondo and a bronze in swimming. Additionally, a Portuguese athlete was part of a mixed team that won a gold medal in triathlon.

== Medalists ==
Medal	Name	Sport	Event	Date
Gold	Miguel Fernandes	Triathlon	Mixed relay (in mixed-NOC team with Europe 1)	19 August
Silver	Mário Silva	Taekwondo	Boys' 63 kg	17 August
Bronze	Ana Rodrigues	Swimming	Girls' 50 metre breaststroke	16 August

== Athletics ==
Athlete	Event	Heats			Final		
Athlete	Event	Time	Rank	Overall	Time	Rank	Overall
Carlos Manuel Sampaio Nascimento	Boys' 100 metres	11.02	2	10 Q_{B}	10.79	1	9

== Canoeing ==
Athlete	Event	Time trial		Round 1	Round 2 (Rep)	Round 3	Round 4	Round 5	Final
Athlete	Event	Time	Rank	Opposition Result	Opposition Result	Opposition Result	Opposition Result	Opposition Result	Opposition Result
Christina Blake Pedroso	Girls' K1 Slalom	1:57.34	14	Kichasova (UKR); L 1:53.90-1:48.71		Zasterova (CZE); L 1:54.18-1:39.88	did not advance		
Christina Blake Pedroso	Girls K1 Sprint	1:46.79	10	Segal (RSA); L 1:47.64-1:45.66	Denhollander (CAN); W 1:46.65-2:15.57	Segal (RSA); L 1:48.35-1:46.38	did not advance		
João Barbosa da Silva	Boys' K1 Slalom	1:40.42	10	Totka (HUN); W 1:42.73-145.40		Bernis (FRA); L 1:41.11-1:29.62	did not advance		
João Barbosa da Silva	Boys' K1 Sprint	1:33.68	9	Brus (SLO); W 1:32.59-1:33.97		Jiménez (CUB); L 1:34.04-1:33.65	did not advance		

== Cycling ==
Cross Country

Athlete	Event	Time	Rank	Points
Joao Tago Cancela Leal	Boys’ Cross Country	1:06:56	22	72
Magda Soraia Fernandes Martins	Girls’ Cross Country	54:19	10	30

Time Trial

Athlete	Event	Time	Rank	Points
Rafael Ferreira Reis	Boys’ Time Trial	3:56.64	1	1
Magda Soraia Fernandes Martins	Girls’ Time Trial	3:43.83	21	40

BMX

Athlete	Event	Seeding Round		Quarterfinals							Semifinals							Final		
Athlete	Event	Seeding Round		Run 1		Run 2		Run 3		Rank	Run 1		Run 2		Run 3		Rank	Final		
Athlete	Event	Time	Rank	Time	Rank	Time	Rank	Time	Rank	Rank	Time	Rank	Time	Rank	Time	Rank	Rank	Time	Rank	Points
Rodrigo Jose Jeronimo Gomes	Boys’ BMX	46.651	26	47.600	5	47.837	7	47.851	7	7	did not advance									72
Magda Soraia Fernandes Martins	Girls’ BMX	47.071	17	46.577	5	46.567	5	47.961	5	5	did not advance									40

Road Race

Athlete	Event	Time	Rank	Points
Rafael Ferreira Reis	Boys’ Road Race	1:05:44	2	5*
Joao Tago Cancela Leal	Boys’ Road Race	1:05:44	28	
Rodrigo Jose Jeronimo Gomes	Boys’ Road Race	1:05:44	41	

Overall

Team	Event	Cross Country Pts		Time Trial Pts		BMX Pts		Road Race Pts	Total	Rank
Team	Event	Boys	Girls	Boys	Girls	Boys	Girls	Road Race Pts	Total	Rank
Magda Soraia Fernandes Martins; Joao Tago Cancela Leal; Rafael Ferreira Reis; Rodrigo Jose Jeronimo Gomes	Mixed Team	72	30	1	40	72	40	5*	260	9

  - Received -5 for finishing road race with all three racers

== Gymnastics ==
Athlete	Event	Qualification				Final			
Athlete	Event	Difficulty	Execution	Total	Rank	Difficulty	Execution	Total	Rank
Filipa Choon	Women's beam	4.600	7.800	12.400	26	Did not advance			
Filipa Choon	Women's floor	4.300	7.750	12.050	25	Did not advance			
Filipa Choon	Women's uneven bars	2.800	7.900	10.700	32	Did not advance			
Filipa Choon	Women's vault	4.400	8.750	13.150	24	Did not advance			
Filipa Choon	Girls' artistic individual all-around			48.300	29	Did not advance			

== Rowing ==
Athlete	Event	Heats		Repechage		Semifinals		Final		Overall Rank
Athlete	Event	Time	Rank	Time	Rank	Time	Rank	Time	Rank	Overall Rank
Patricia Rodrigues Batista	Girls' Single Sculls	4:05.64	5 QR	4:11.61	3 QC/D	4:19.49	5 QD	4:16.08	3	20

== Sailing ==
Athlete	Event	Races											Medal race	Total points	Net points	Rank
Athlete	Event	1	2	3	4	5	6	7	8	9	10	11	Medal race	Total points	Net points	Rank
Gonçalo Pires	Boys' Byte CII	1	8	14	5	~~16~~	14	~~26~~	11	16	11	3	17	142	100	10
Inês Sobral	Girls' Byte CII	17	8	~~25~~	22	6	10	16	5	5	~~26~~	10	23	173	122	15

== Swimming ==
Athlete	Event	Heats			Semifinals			Final	
Athlete	Event	Time	Rank	Overall	Time	Rank	Overall	Time	Rank
Ana Rodrigues	Girls' 50m breaststroke	32.75	1	4 Q	32.30	1	3 Q	32.49	Bronze medal
Ana Rodrigues	Girls' 50m freestyle	27.20	7	20	Did not advance				
Ana Rodrigues	Girls' 100m breaststroke	1:15.31	7	24	Did not advance				
Ana Rodrigues	Girls' 200m breaststroke	2:46.84	7	18	N/A			Did not advance	
Maria Rosa	Girls' 50m freestyle	28.38	7	36	Did not advance				
Maria Rosa	Girls' 100m freestyle	59.45	8	30	Did not advance				
Maria Rosa	Girls' 100m breaststroke	1:16.40	7	26	Did not advance				
Maria Rosa	Girls' 200m medley	2:24.23	5	17	Did not advance				
Gustavo Santa	Boys' 100m freestyle	53.76	6	37	Did not advance				
Gustavo Santa	Boys' 200m freestyle	1:55.69	3	24	Did not advance				
Gustavo Santa	Boys' 400m freestyle	4:07.01	6	20	Did not advance				
Alexis Santos	Boys' 50m backstroke	N/A			26.62	2	4 Q	26.86	6
Alexis Santos	Boys' 100m backstroke	57.45	4	7 Q	58.06	8	15	Did not advance	
Alexis Santos	Boys' 200m backstroke	2:07.68	4	13	N/A			Did not advance	
Alexis Santos	Boys' 200m medley	2:08.38	6	19	Did not advance				

== Table tennis ==
Individual

Athlete	Event	Round 1		Round 2		Quarterfinals	Semifinals	Final	Rank
Athlete	Event	Group Matches	Rank	Group Matches	Rank	Quarterfinals	Semifinals	Final	Rank
Maria Xiao	Girls' Singles	Laid (ALG); W 3-0 (11-5, 11-7, 11-7)	2 Q	Kim (PRK); L 1-3 (11-7, 1-11, 9-11, 11-13)	3	Did not advance			9
Maria Xiao	Girls' Singles	Sawettabut (THA); L 2-3 (8-11, 11-8, 6-11, 15-13, 10-12)	2 Q	Szocs (ROU); W 3-0 (11-8, 11-8, 11-8)	3	Did not advance			9
Maria Xiao	Girls' Singles	Nagyvaradi (HUN); W 3-0 (16-14, 11-6, 11-8)	2 Q	Ng (HKG); W 3-1 (13-15, 11-7, 11-3, 11-8)	3	Did not advance			9

Team

Athlete	Event	Round 1		Round 2	Quarterfinals	Semifinals	Final	Rank
Athlete	Event	Group Matches	Rank	Round 2	Quarterfinals	Semifinals	Final	Rank
Europe 2 Maria Xiao (POR); Emilien Vanrossomme (BEL)	Mixed Team	Intercontinental 3 Phan (AUS); Mejia (ESA); W 3-0 (3-0, 3-0, 3-0)	2 Q	Intercontinental 1 Gu Yuting (CHN); Hmam (TUN); L 1-2 (0-3, 3-2, 2-3)	Did not advance			9
Europe 2 Maria Xiao (POR); Emilien Vanrossomme (BEL)	Mixed Team	France; Pang (FRA); Gauzy (FRA); L 1-2 (3-0, 1-3, 1-3)	2 Q	Intercontinental 1 Gu Yuting (CHN); Hmam (TUN); L 1-2 (0-3, 3-2, 2-3)	Did not advance			9
Europe 2 Maria Xiao (POR); Emilien Vanrossomme (BEL)	Mixed Team	Europe 6 Galic (SLO); Leitgeb (AUT); W 3-0 (3-0, 3-1, 3-2)	2 Q	Intercontinental 1 Gu Yuting (CHN); Hmam (TUN); L 1-2 (0-3, 3-2, 2-3)	Did not advance			9

== Taekwondo ==
Athlete	Event	Preliminary	Quarterfinal	Semifinal	Final	Rank
Athlete	Event	Opposition Result	Opposition Result	Opposition Result	Opposition Result	Rank
Mário Silva	Boys' 63 kg	Kiki (BEN); W 18–0	Arventii (MDA); W 5–3	Sungu (TUR); W 5–3	Seo (KOR); L 5–9	Silver medal

== Triathlon ==
Boys

Athlete	Event	Swim (1.5 km)	Trans 1	Bike (40 km)	Trans 2	Run (10 km)	Total	Rank
Miguel Fernandes	Individual	8:42	0:30	28:40	0:22	16:58	55:12.57	4

Girls

Triathlete	Event	Swimming	Transit 1	Cycling	Transit 2	Running	Total time	Rank
Raquel Mafra Rocha	Individual	10:02	0:37	32:58	0:32	22:00	1:06:09.22	18

Mixed

Athlete	Event	Total Times per Athlete (Swim 250 m, Bike 7 km, Run 1.7 km)	Total Group Time	Rank
Charlotte Deldaele (BEL); Andriy Sirenko (UKR); Raquel Mafra Rocha (POR); Diego Paz (ESP)	Mixed Team Relay; Europe 5	20:48; 19:26; 23:05; 20:30	1:23:49.96	10
Eszter Dudas (HUN); Miguel Fernandes (POR); Fanny Beisaron (ISR); Alois Knabl (AUT)	Mixed Team Relay; Europe 1	20:46; 18.58; 21:11; 18:56	1:19:51.42	1st place, gold medalist(s)
