= Thailand at the 2010 Summer Youth Olympics =

- IOC code: THA
- NOC: National Olympic Committee of Thailand
- Website: www.olympicthai.or.th (in Thai and English)

in Singapore
- Competitors: 34 in 15 sports
- Flag bearer: Jirapong Meenapra
- Medals Ranked 14th: Gold 4 Silver 3 Bronze 0 Total 7

Summer Youth Olympics appearances (overview)
- 2010; 2014; 2018; 2026

Thailand participated in the 2010 Summer Youth Olympics in Singapore.

== Medalists ==
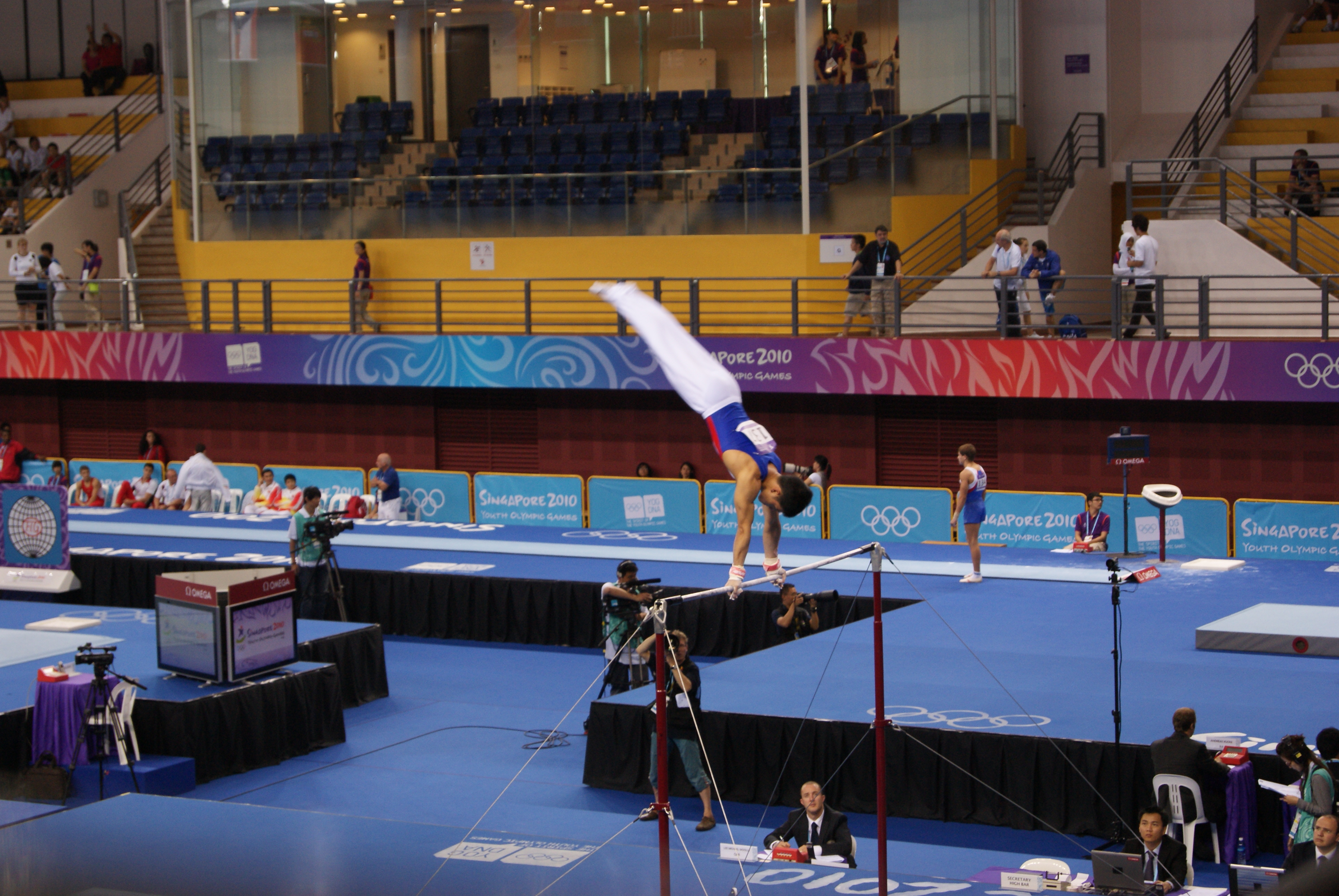
Gymnast Weena Chokpaoumpai performing on the horizontal bar during the artistic gymnastics competition on 16 August 2010 at Bishan Sports Hall, Singapore

Medal	Name	Sport	Event	Date
Gold	Worawong Pongpanit	Taekwondo	Girls' 49kg	16 Aug
Gold	Pisit Poodchalat	Badminton	Boys' Single	19 Aug
Gold	Sapsiree Taerattanachai	Badminton	Girls' Single	19 Aug
Gold	Siripon Kaewduang-ngam	Sailing	Girls' Techno 293	25 Aug
Silver	Sirivimon Pramongkhol	Weightlifting	Girls' 48kg	15 Aug
Silver	Chatuphum Chinnawong	Weightlifting	Boys' 77kg	18 Aug
Silver	Chitchanok Pulsubsakul	Weightlifting	Girls' +63kg	18 Aug

== Archery ==
Boys

Athlete	Event	Ranking Round		Round of 32	Round of 16	Quarterfinals	Semifinals	Final	
Athlete	Event	Score	Seed	Opposition Score	Opposition Score	Opposition Score	Opposition Score	Opposition Score	Rank
Tanapat Harikul	Boys’ Individual	535	30	Nesbitt (GBR); L 3-7	Did not advance				

Mixed Team

Athlete	Event	Ranking Round		Round of 32	Round of 16	Quarterfinals	Semifinals	Final	
Athlete	Event	Score	Seed	Opposition Score	Opposition Score	Opposition Score	Opposition Score	Opposition Score	Rank
Tanapat Harikul (THA); Ya-Ting Tan (TPE)	Mixed Team	1183	27	Caspersen (DEN)/ Rossignol (FRA); L 4-6	Did not advance				

== Athletics ==
=== Boys ===
Track and Road Events

Athletes	Event	Qualification		Final	
Athletes	Event	Result	Rank	Result	Rank
Jirapong Meenapra	Boys’ 100m	10.72	3 Q	10.71	5

Field Events

Athletes	Event	Qualification		Final	
Athletes	Event	Result	Rank	Result	Rank
Panyawut Bumroong	Boys’ Shot Put	16.40	16 qB	16.04	15

=== Girls ===
Track and Road Events

Athletes	Event	Qualification		Final	
Athletes	Event	Result	Rank	Result	Rank
Jantraporn Vongsuwakunta	Girls’ 5km Walk			29:06.19	14

Field Events

Athletes	Event	Qualification		Final	
Athletes	Event	Result	Rank	Result	Rank
Subenrat Insaeng	Girls’ Discus Throw	44.96	8 Q	45.47	5
Pennapa Tantragool	Girls’ Long Jump	5.08	15 qB	5.24	15

== Badminton ==
Boys

Athlete	Event	Group stage				Knock-Out Stage			
Athlete	Event	Match 1	Match 2	Match 3	Rank	Quarterfinal	Semifinal	Final	Rank
Pisit Poodchalat	Boys’ Singles	Qaddoum (JOR) W 2-0 (21-3, 21-6)	Quach (DEN) W 2-0 (21-18, 21-15)	Westerback (SWE) W 2-0 (21-13, 21-11)	1 Q	Huang (CHN) W 2-0 (21-16, 21-19)	Loh (MAS) W 2-1 (21-13, 19-21, 21-3)	Kumar (IND) W 2-0 (21-15, 21-16)	Gold medal

Girls

Athlete	Event	Group stage				Knock-Out Stage			
Athlete	Event	Match 1	Match 2	Match 3	Rank	Quarterfinal	Semifinal	Final	Rank
Sapsiree Taerattanachai	Girls’ Singles	Tapumanaia (TUV) W 2-0 (21-1, 21-0)	Handunkuttihettige (SRI) W 2-0 (21-13, 21-9)	Chiang (TPE) W 2-0 (21-13, 21-7)	1 Q	Cheah (MAS) W 2-0 (21-15, 21-16)	Vu (VIE) W 2-0 (21-18, 21-8)	Deng (CHN) W 2-0 (21-14, 21-17)	Gold medal

== Basketball ==
Girls

Squad list	Event	Group stage		Placement stage			Rank
Squad list	Event	Group C	Rank	17th-20th			Rank
Pornnutcha Sawatong (C); Thidaporn Maihom; Aungkana Buapa; Punnida Arjsri	Girls' Basketball	China; L 13-34	5	Chile; W 24-13	Singapore; W 29-28	Vanuatu; W 33-15	17
Pornnutcha Sawatong (C); Thidaporn Maihom; Aungkana Buapa; Punnida Arjsri	Girls' Basketball	Mali; L 18-23	5	Chile; W 24-13	Singapore; W 29-28	Vanuatu; W 33-15	17
Pornnutcha Sawatong (C); Thidaporn Maihom; Aungkana Buapa; Punnida Arjsri	Girls' Basketball	Brazil; L 9-31	5	Chile; W 24-13	Singapore; W 29-28	Vanuatu; W 33-15	17
Pornnutcha Sawatong (C); Thidaporn Maihom; Aungkana Buapa; Punnida Arjsri	Girls' Basketball	Czech Republic; L 26-28	5	Chile; W 24-13	Singapore; W 29-28	Vanuatu; W 33-15	17

== Cycling ==
Cross Country

Athlete	Event	Time	Rank	Points
Satjakul Sianglam	Boys’ Cross Country	1:05:54	20	72
Siriluck Christoforou	Girls’ Cross Country	52:40	8	24

Time Trial

Athlete	Event	Time	Rank	Points
Sarawaut Sirironnachai	Boys’ Time Trial	4:19.62	20	30
Siriluck Christoforou	Girls’ Time Trial	3:44.10	22	40

BMX

Athlete	Event	Seeding Round		Quarterfinals							Semifinals							Final		
Athlete	Event	Seeding Round		Run 1		Run 2		Run 3		Rank	Run 1		Run 2		Run 3		Rank	Final		
Athlete	Event	Time	Rank	Time	Rank	Time	Rank	Time	Rank	Rank	Time	Rank	Time	Rank	Time	Rank	Rank	Time	Rank	Points
Jukrapech Wichana	Boys’ BMX	39.661	22	38.485	6	38.634	6	38.533	6	6	Did not advance									
Siriluck Christoforou	Girls’ BMX	44.891	14	44.327	4	44.061	4	45.651	4	4 Q	45.088	7	44.557	7	43.874	5	7	Did not advance		

Road Race

Athlete	Event	Time	Rank	Points
Sarawut Sirironnachai	Boys’ Road Race	1:05:44	15	68*
Satjakul Sianglam	Boys’ Road Race	1:05:44	17	
Jukrapech Wichana	Boys’ Road Race	1:05:44	45	

Overall

Team	Event	Cross Country Pts		Time Trial Pts		BMX Pts		Road Race Pts	Total	Rank
Team	Event	Boys	Girls	Boys	Girls	Boys	Girls	Road Race Pts	Total	Rank
Siriluck Christoforou; Satjakul Sianglam; Sarawut Sirironnachai; Jukrapech Wichana	Mixed Team	72	24	30	40	72	36	63*	337	25

- * Received -5 for finishing road race with all three racers

== Gymnastics ==
=== Artistic Gymnastics ===
Boys

Athlete	Event	Floor		Pommel Horse		Rings		Vault		Parallel Bars		Horizontal Bar		Total	
Athlete	Event	Score	Rank	Score	Rank	Score	Rank	Score	Rank	Score	Rank	Score	Rank	Score	Rank
Weena Chokpaoumpai	Boys' Qualification	14.050	9	12.550	27	13.200	25	15.100	19 Q	12.750	25	12.450	31	80.100	25

Athlete	Event	Score	Rank
Weena Chokpaoumpai	Boys' Vault	13.362	5

Girls

Athlete	Event	Vault		Uneven Bars		Beam		Floor		Total	
Athlete	Event	Score	Rank	Score	Rank	Score	Rank	Score	Rank	Score	Rank
Rawiwarn Muaktanod	Girls' Qualification	12.500	33	9.550	36	12.800	17	11.950	28	46.800	31

== Rowing ==
Athlete	Event	Heats		Repechage		Semifinals		Final		Overall Rank
Athlete	Event	Time	Rank	Time	Rank	Time	Rank	Time	Rank	Overall Rank
Varaporn Monchai; Anita Mindra Whiskin	Girls' Pair	4:00.25	5 QR	4:08.87	4	Did not advance				

== Sailing ==
One Person Dinghy

Athlete	Event	Race												Points	Rank
Athlete	Event	1	2	3	4	5	6	7	8	9	10	11	M*	Points	Rank
Supakon Pongwichean	Boys' Byte CII	17	10	22	17	3	12	10	19	~~25~~	~~27~~	23	8	141	20

Windsurfing

Athlete	Event	Race											Points	Rank
Athlete	Event	1	2	3	4	5	6	7	8	9	10	M*	Points	Rank
Siripon Kaewduang-Ngam	Girls' Techno 293	1	~~9~~	1	9	2	1	1	1	1	1	4	22	Gold medal

== Shooting ==
Pistol

Athlete	Event	Qualification		Final		
Athlete	Event	Score	Rank	Score	Total	Rank
Kanokkan Chaimongkol	Girls' 10m Air Pistol	368	13	Did not advance		

== Swimming ==
Athletes	Event	Heat		Semifinal		Final	
Athletes	Event	Time	Position	Time	Position	Time	Position
Nuttapong Ketin	Boys’ 100m Breaststroke	1:05.71	18	Did not advance			
Nuttapong Ketin	Boys’ 200m Breaststroke	2:17.05	2 Q			2:17.93	7
Nuttapong Ketin	Boys’ 200m Individual Medley	2:05.62	12			Did not advance	
Patarawadee Kittiya	Girls’ 100m Butterfly	1:02.60	17 Q*	DNS		Did not advance	
Patarawadee Kittiya	Girls’ 200m Butterfly	2:15.99	11			Did not advance	

- * Qualified due to the withdrawal of another swimmer.

== Table tennis ==
Individual

Athlete	Event	Round 1		Round 2		Quarterfinals	Semifinals	Final	Rank
Athlete	Event	Group Matches	Rank	Group Matches	Rank	Quarterfinals	Semifinals	Final	Rank
Tanapol Santiwattanatarm	Boys' Singles	Chiu (HKG); L 1-3 (7-11, 14-16, 12-10, 12-14)	3 qB	Wagner (GER); W 3-0 (w/o)	1	Did not advance			
Tanapol Santiwattanatarm	Boys' Singles	Marakkala (SRI); W 3-2 (11-7, 12-14, 10-12, 11-9, 11-5)	3 qB	Wu (NZL); W 3-0 (11-8, 11-8, 11-8)	1	Did not advance			
Tanapol Santiwattanatarm	Boys' Singles	Bajger (CZE); L 0-3 (4-11, 9-11, 6-11)	3 qB	Kam (MRI); W 3-0 (11-7, 11-2, 12-10)	1	Did not advance			
Suthasini Sawettabut	Girls' Singles	Nagyvaradi (HUN); W 3-0 (11-4, 11-5, 11-3)	1 Q	Bliznet (MDA); W 3-1 (11-9, 11-8, 11-13, 11-0)	1 Q	Tanioka (JPN); W 4-0 (11-7, 11-4, 12-10, 11-8)	Li (SIN); L 0-4 (9-11, 6-11, 6-11, 9-11)	Yang (KOR); L 1-4 (11-9, 5-11, 4-11, 7-11, 6-11)	4
Suthasini Sawettabut	Girls' Singles	Xiao (POR); W 3-2 (11-8, 8-11, 11-6, 13-15, 12-10)	1 Q	Eerland (NED); W 3-2 (7-11, 11-4, 12-10, 9-11, 11-6)	1 Q	Tanioka (JPN); W 4-0 (11-7, 11-4, 12-10, 11-8)	Li (SIN); L 0-4 (9-11, 6-11, 6-11, 9-11)	Yang (KOR); L 1-4 (11-9, 5-11, 4-11, 7-11, 6-11)	4
Suthasini Sawettabut	Girls' Singles	Laid (ALG); W 3-0 (11-5, 11-3, 11-1)	1 Q	Kumahara (BRA); W 3-0 (11-7, 11-9, 11-3)	1 Q	Tanioka (JPN); W 4-0 (11-7, 11-4, 12-10, 11-8)	Li (SIN); L 0-4 (9-11, 6-11, 6-11, 9-11)	Yang (KOR); L 1-4 (11-9, 5-11, 4-11, 7-11, 6-11)	4

Team

Athlete	Event	Round 1		Round 2	Quarterfinals	Semifinals	Final	Rank
Athlete	Event	Group Matches	Rank	Round 2	Quarterfinals	Semifinals	Final	Rank
Thailand; Suthasini Sawettabut (THA); Tanapol Santiwattanatarm (THA)	Mixed Team	Sri Lanka; Vithanage (SRI); Marakkala (SRI); W 3-0 (3-0, 3-2, 3-0)	1 Q	Croatia; Jeger (CRO); Fucec (CRO); W 2-0 (3-0, 3-2)	Korea; Yang (KOR); Kim (KOR); L 0-2 (0-3, 1-3)	Did not advance		
Thailand; Suthasini Sawettabut (THA); Tanapol Santiwattanatarm (THA)	Mixed Team	Hong Kong; Ng (HKG); Chiu (HKG); W 2-1 (3-2, 2-3, 3-1)	1 Q	Croatia; Jeger (CRO); Fucec (CRO); W 2-0 (3-0, 3-2)	Korea; Yang (KOR); Kim (KOR); L 0-2 (0-3, 1-3)	Did not advance		
Thailand; Suthasini Sawettabut (THA); Tanapol Santiwattanatarm (THA)	Mixed Team	India; Bhandarkar (IND); Das (IND); W 2-1 (3-0, 2-3, 3-1)	1 Q	Croatia; Jeger (CRO); Fucec (CRO); W 2-0 (3-0, 3-2)	Korea; Yang (KOR); Kim (KOR); L 0-2 (0-3, 1-3)	Did not advance		

== Taekwondo ==
Athlete	Event	Preliminary	Quarterfinal	Semifinal	Final	Rank
Worawong Pongpanit	Girls' -49kg	Jacira Mendes (CPV); W KO R1 0:38	Haya Jumaa (UAE); W 12-2	Melanie Phan (CAN); W 4+-4	Dana Touran (JOR); W 5-4	Gold medal

== Tennis ==
Singles

Athlete	Event	Round 1	Round 2	Quarterfinals	Semifinals	Final	Rank
Luksika Kumkhum	Girls' Singles	Pérez (VEN); W 2-1 (6-7, 6-2, 6-3)	Kremen (BLR); W 2-1 (1-6, 6-3, 6-0)	Čepelová (SVK); L 0-2 (3-6, 4-6)	Did not advance		

Doubles

Athlete	Event	Round 1	Quarterfinals	Semifinals	Final	Rank
Luksika Kumkhum (THA); Grace Sari Ysidora (INA)	Girls' Doubles	Ishizu (JPN); Mutaguchi (JPN); L 0-2 (1-6, 4-6)	Did not advance			

== Triathlon ==
Girls

Triathlete	Event	Swimming	Transit 1	Cycling	Transit 2	Running	Total time	Rank
Mattika Maneekaew	Girls' Individual	12:33	0:40	37:52	0:33	23:05	1:14:43.06	29

Mixed

Athlete	Event	Total Times per Athlete (Swim 250 m, Bike 7 km, Run 1.7 km)	Total Group Time	Rank
Asia 3 Tüvshinjargalyn Enkhjargal (MGL); Kirill Uvarov (KAZ); Mattika Maneekaew (THA); Scott Yiqiang Ang (SIN)	Mixed Team Relay	25:14; 21:02; 25:50; 22:22	1:34:28.69	15

== Weightlifting ==
Athlete	Event	Snatch	Clean & jerk	Total	Rank
Tairat Bunsuk	Boys' 69kg	119	150	269	5
Chatuphum Chinnawong	Boys' 77kg	141	170	311	Silver medal
Sirivimon Pramongkhol	Girls' 48kg	68	95	163	Silver medal
Chitchanok Pulsabsakul	Girls' +63kg	115	136	251	Silver medal
