= Indonesia at the 2010 Summer Youth Olympics =

- IOC code: INA
- NOC: Komite Olahraga Nasional Indonesia

in Singapore
- Competitors: 14 in 7 sports
- Flag bearer: Destian Satria
- Medals Ranked 84th: Gold 0 Silver 0 Bronze 1 Total 1

Summer Youth Olympics appearances (overview)
- 2010; 2014; 2018

Indonesia participated in the 2010 Summer Youth Olympics (14–26 August) in Singapore with 14 athletes. The team competed in a total of seven sports: archery, badminton, cycling, swimming, taekwondo, tennis, and weightlifting. According to the head of the national contingent, Ade Lukman, athlete training was conducted by individual managers of each sport. All athletes were gathered in Jakarta on 6 August for a cultural training session.

The Indonesian government allocated 120 million rupiah (US$13,200) for monthly expenses used for preparations for the games. Each athlete received Rp 2.5 million a month and Rp 150,000 a day for lodging, as well as Rp 150,000 a month for daily expenses. Each coach and manager received Rp 5 million a month. Funding was approved in early July after a request was filed in May. Djoko Pramono, the team's chief manager, criticized the government for the delay in funding, which was received only one month prior to the games. Athletes and other officials of the national team were sent off at a ceremony attended by Rita Subowo, Chairwoman of the National Sports Committee of Indonesia, on 10 August. Although the team did not set a target for any medals, they expected good results from badminton and weightlifting.

== Medalists ==
Medal	Name	Sport	Event	Date
Bronze	Dewi Safitri	Weightlifting	Women's 53kg	16 August

== Archery ==
Erwina Safitri, the nation's lone representative in archery, was given a wild card berth by the International Archery Federation.

Girls

Athlete	Event	Ranking Round		Round of 32	Round of 16	Quarterfinals	Semifinals	Final	
Athlete	Event	Score	Seed	Opposition Score	Opposition Score	Opposition Score	Opposition Score	Opposition Score	Rank
Erwina Safitri	Girls’ Individual	601	14	Okubo (JPN); L 4-6	Did not advance				17

Mixed Team

Athlete	Event	Partner	Round of 32	Round of 16	Quarterfinals	Semifinals	Final	
Athlete	Event	Partner	Opposition Score	Opposition Score	Opposition Score	Opposition Score	Opposition Score	Rank
Erwina Safitri	Mixed Team	Vitaliy Komonyuk (UKR)	Kamel (EGY)/ Oever (NED); L 5-6	Did not advance				17

== Badminton ==
Evert Sukamta and Renna Suwarno, both 18 years old, are the nation's representatives in badminton. Sukamta earned his berth in the Olympics after finishing in the top five in the boys' singles event of the 2010 Asian Junior Badminton Championships in Kuala Lumpur. Suwarno, on the other hand, did not qualify for the quarterfinals but was given the opportunity to complete after the Chinese team exceeded its maximum quota of two players per nation when three of its players placed in the top five of the championships. No other Indonesian players qualified after the national team's poor performance at the 2010 BWF World Junior Championships in Guadalajara, the final qualifying event for the Singapore games. National team badminton trainer Ronny Agustinus believed the greatest threat in their path toward the medals was the Chinese team, who were evenly matched with Indonesia at the youth level.

Sukamta played in pool B in the preliminary round of the boys' singles tournament. He defeated his first opponent, Kento Horiuchi of Japan, on 15 August in three sets with scores 21–7, 14–21, 21–13. Later in the evening, Sukamta defeated Irfan Djabar of Suriname in straight sets 21–4, 21–10. His success was replicated by Suwarno in pool D of the girls' singles tournament, defeating Victoria Cheng of New Zealand in straight sets 21–15, 21–5, and Katherine Winder of Peru with scores 21–9, 21–12. Sukamta won his final preliminary round match on 16 August, defeating Henry Pan of Canada in straight sets 21–17, 21–13. By winning all three preliminary matches and placing first in his pool, Sukamta proceeded into the quarterfinals. Suwarno, on the other hand, failed to mount a comeback and lost her third preliminary match against China's Deng Xuan 11–21, 20–22. She did not advance into the final rounds of the tournament after placing second in her pool.

In the quarterfinal round of the boys' tournament on 17 August, Sukamta faced number 1 seed Kang Ji-wook of South Korea. He lost the first set 11–21 but came back to win the second set 21–14. In the third set, Sukamta was not able to adapt to Kang's change in playing tempo and succumbed to his opponent 13–21. The match took 47 minutes to complete.

Boys

Athlete	Event	Group stage				Knock-Out Stage			
Athlete	Event	Match 1	Match 2	Match 3	Rank	Quarterfinal	Semifinal	Final	Rank
Evert Sukamta	Boys' Singles	Horiuchi (JPN); W 2-1 (21–7, 14–21, 21–13)	Djabar (SUR); W 2-0 (21–4, 21–10)	Pan (CAN); W 2-0 (21–17, 21–13)	1 Q	(1) Kang (KOR); L 1-2 (11–21, 21–14, 13–21)	Did not advance		=5

Girls

Athlete	Event	Group stage				Knock-Out Stage			
Athlete	Event	Match 1	Match 2	Match 3	Rank	Quarterfinal	Semifinal	Final	Rank
Renna Suwarno	Girls' Singles	Cheng (NZL); W 2-0 (21–15, 21–5)	Winder (PER); W 2-0 (21–9, 21–12)	Deng (CHN); L 0-2 (11–21, 20–22)	2	Did not advance			

== Cycling ==
Four cyclists are sent as the nation's representatives in cycling. Suherman Heryadi, Destian Satria, and Ongky Setiawan were given berths by the Union Cycliste Internationale "based on their achievements this season" during the final allocation of unused quota places. Elga Kharisma Novanda, the only female member of the team, earned her qualification after placing second in the BMX event of the 2010 Singapore Mountain Bike Carnival at Tampines Bike Park.

On 17 August, Kharisma Novanda competed in the girls' 15.5-kilometre (9.6 mi) cross country race and placed 13th, finishing 8 minutes and 27 seconds behind race leader Karolina Kalasova of the Czech Republic. In the boys' cross country race, Destian Satria finished in 28th place and was lapped with 3 laps to go by leader Jhonnatan Botero of Colombia.

Cross Country

Athlete	Event	Time	Rank	Points
Destian Satria	Boys’ Cross Country	-3LAP	28	72
Elga Kharisma Novanda	Girls’ Cross Country	55:25	13	36

Time Trial

Athlete	Event	Time	Rank	Points
Ongky Setiawan	Boys’ Time Trial	4:20.30	23	30
Elga Kharisma Novanda	Girls’ Time Trial	3:36.98	11	32

BMX

Athlete	Event	Seeding Round		Quarterfinals							Semifinals							Final		
Athlete	Event	Seeding Round		Run 1		Run 2		Run 3		Rank	Run 1		Run 2		Run 3		Rank	Final		
Athlete	Event	Time	Rank	Time	Rank	Time	Rank	Time	Rank	Rank	Time	Rank	Time	Rank	Time	Rank	Rank	Time	Rank	Points
Suherman Heryadi	Boys’ BMX	48.303	27	47.679	8	1:03.806	8	48.285	8	8	Did not advance									72
Elga Kharisma Novanda	Girls’ BMX	41.454	7	41.054	2	40.971	2	40.235	2	2 Q	40.331	4	40.798	4	40.894	4	4 Q	39.624	7	21

Road Race

Athlete	Event	Time	Rank	Points
Suherman Heryadi	Boys’ Road Race	1:05:44	31	72
Destian Satria	Boys’ Road Race	DNF		
Ongky Setiawan	Boys’ Road Race	DNF		

Overall

Team	Event	Cross Country Pts		Time Trial Pts		BMX Pts		Road Race Pts	Total	Rank
Team	Event	Boys	Girls	Boys	Girls	Boys	Girls	Road Race Pts	Total	Rank
Elga Kharisma Novanda; Destian Satria; Ongky Setiawan; Destian Satria	Mixed Team	72	36	30	32	72	21	72	335	24

== Swimming ==
Ratna Marita finished 16th overall in the heats of the girls' 200-metre individual medley on 15 August and did not advance into the final round. She finished the swim two seconds slower than her personal best and attributed the loss to over-preparation and a difficult training schedule. Marita will compete at the 2010 Asian Games in November. Patricia Hapsari competed in the girls' 100-metre freestyle on 16 August and placed first in the third heat. Her time of 58.85 seconds improved on her personal best of 59.90 seconds. However, Hapsari did not qualify for the next round as her result placed her 24th overall in the heats.

Boys

Athletes	Event	Heat		Semifinal		Final	
Athletes	Event	Time	Position	Time	Position	Time	Position
Arnoscy Siahaan	Boys' 200m Butterfly	2:09.46	20			Did not advance	

Girls

Athletes	Event	Heat		Semifinal		Final	
Athletes	Event	Time	Position	Time	Position	Time	Position
Patricia Hapsari	Girls' 100m Freestyle	58.85	24	Did not advance			
Ratna Marita	Girls' 200m Individual Medley	2:23.92	16			Did not advance	

== Taekwondo ==
Macho Hungan, the nation's lone representative in taekwondo, was given a wild card berth by the World Taekwondo Federation.

Athlete	Event	Quarterfinal	Semifinal	Final	Rank
Macho Hungan	Boys' +73kg	Liu Chang (CHN); L 2-7	Did not advance		5

== Tennis ==
Grace Sari Ysidora is the nation's lone representative in tennis. Ysidora was previously ranked in the world's top 40; she received a wild card berth in the Singapore games from the International Tennis Federation after a request was filed by Martina Wijaya, the chairwoman of Indonesia's national tennis association. Ysidora was eliminated from the girls' singles tournament on 15 August in the first round match against Denisa Allertova of the Czech Republic in straight sets 3–6, 2–6. Allertova, who played with greater power than Ysidora, was able to find a weakness by consistently forcing her to return the ball with the forehand.

Girls

Athlete	Event	Round of 32	Round of 16	Quarterfinals	Semifinals	Final	Consolation Round of 16	Consolation Quarterfinals	Consolation Semifinals	Consolation Final
Athlete	Event	Opposition Score	Opposition Score	Opposition Score	Opposition Score	Opposition Score	Opposition Score	Opposition Score	Opposition Score	Opposition Score
Grace Sari Ysidora	Singles	Allertova (CZE); L 3–6, 2–6	Did not advance				Ishizu (JPN); L Walkover	Did not advance		
Grace Sari Ysidora; Kumkhum (THA)	Doubles		Ishizu (JPN); Mutaguchi (JPN); L 1–6, 4–6	Did not advance						

== Weightlifting ==
Zainudin and Dewi Safitri are the nation's representatives in weightlifting. Sumariyanto had been one of Indonesia's representatives, but he did not meet the age requirement of the competition despite finishing third in the men's 56 kg event at the 2009 World Youth Weightlifting Championships in Chiang Mai. Zainudin, who placed first in the men's 62 kg event at the national championships, was selected by the Indonesian Weightlifting, Bodybuilding and Powerlifting Association to replace him. Dewi Safitri secured her berth after finishing third in the women's 53 kg event at the 2009 Asian Youth Weightlifting Championships in Tashkent.

Both lifters competed on 16 August. Safitri, who competed against eight other weightlifters, placed third in the girls' 53 kg event and won Indonesia its first medal, the bronze. She lifted 71 kilograms (157 lb) in the snatch and 100 kilograms (220 lb) in the clean and jerk, for a total of 171 kilograms (377 lb). Safitri had failed to execute her first and third snatch lifts and the first clean and jerk lift. During training in the week prior to the competition, she had lifted a combined 182 kilograms (401 lb), leading weightlifting coach Sodikin to believe the result was not her best performance. Despite this, the bronze medal fulfilled Safitri's promise of bringing home a medal in time for the annual celebration of Indonesia's independence, which falls on 17 August. Zainudin competed against 12 other athletes and ranked fifth in the boys' 62 kg event. He lifted 107 kilograms (236 lb) in the snatch and 132 kilograms (291 lb) in the clean and jerk for a total of 239 kilograms (527 lb).

Boys

Athlete	Event	Snatch	Clean & jerk	Total	Rank
Zainudin Zainudin	−62 kg	107	132	239	5

Girls

Athlete	Event	Snatch	Clean & jerk	Total	Rank
Dewi Safitri	−53 kg	71	100	171	3rd place, bronze medalist(s)

== See also ==
- Indonesia at the Olympics
