= Cycling at the 2010 Summer Youth Olympics – Boys' cross country =

Boys' cross country was part of the cycling at the 2010 Summer Youth Olympics program. The event consisted of seven 3.1 kilometres (1.9 mi) laps of cycling for a total of 21.7 kilometres (13.5 mi). Should an athlete become lapped during the race he would be forced to stop. It was held on 17 August 2010 at Tampines Bike Park. This was not an official individual event and therefore medals were not given. However the performance of the athletes provided points towards the Combined Mixed Team event for cycling.

== Results ==
The race began at approximately 12:00 p.m. (UTC+8) on 17 August at Tampines Bike Park.

Rank	Bib No.	Name	Final Time	Time Behind	Points
1	COL 2	Jhonnatan Botero Villegas (COL)	58:42	±0:00	1
2	ITA 2	Andrea Righettini (ITA)	59:29	+0:47	10
3	BEL 2	Laurens Sweeck (BEL)	1:00:01	+1:19	17
4	POL 2	Bartlomiej Wawak (POL)	1:00:13	+1:31	25
5	MEX 2	Carlos Moran (MEX)	1:01:01	+2:19	30
6	SLO 2	Urban Ferencak (SLO)	1:01:13	+2:31	35
7	NED 2	Thijs Zuurbier (NED)	1:01:37	+2:55	40
8	DEN 2	Magnus Nielsen (DEN)	1:01:44	+3:02	45
9	CZE 2	Daniel Vesely (CZE)	1:02:16	+3:34	50
10	ESP 2	Antonio Santos (ESP)	1:02:22	+3:40	54
11	CHI 2	Nicolas Prudencio Flano (CHI)	1:02:25	+3:43	58
12	SUI 2	Michael Stuenzi (SUI)	1:03:25	+4:43	61
13	CAN 2	Steven Noble (CAN)	1:03:34	+4:52	64
14	HUN 2	Peter Fenyvesi (HUN)	1:03:50	+5:08	66
15	KAZ 2	Vadim Galeyev (KAZ)	1:03:58	+5:16	68
16	BRA 2	William Alexi (BRA)	1:04:17	+5:35	70
17	RSA 2	Luke Roberts (RSA)	1:04:30	+5:48	72
18	ARG 2	Kevin Ingratta (ARG)	1:05:08	+6:26	72
19	JPN 2	Idomu Yamamoto (JPN)	1:05:14	+6:32	72
20	THA 2	Satjakul Sianglam (THA)	1:05:54	+7:12	72
21	LAT 2	Andris Vosekalns (LAT)	1:06:47	+8:05	72
22	POR 2	Joao Tiago Cancela Leal (POR)	1:06:56	+8:14	72
23	NZL 2	Sam Shaw (NZL)	1:08:28	+9:46	72
24	ZIM 2	Nyasha Lungu (ZIM)	-2LAP		72
25	SRB 2	Lazar Jovanovic (SRB)	-2LAP		72
26	BLR 2	Mikita Zharoven (BLR)	-2LAP		72
27	AUS 2	Michael Baker (AUS)	-2LAP		72
28	INA 2	Destian Satria (INA)	-3LAP		72
29	ERI 2	Samuel Akelom Gebremedhin (ERI)	-4LAP		72
30	SIN 2	Jun Jie Daniel Koh (SIN)	-4LAP		72
31	BOL 2	Carlos Montellano (BOL)	-5LAP		72
32	CYP 2	Leontios Katsouris (CYP)	-5LAP		72
