= Taekwondo at the 2010 Summer Youth Olympics – Boys' 63 kg =

Taekwondo competition

The boys' 63 kg competition in taekwondo at the 2010 Summer Youth Olympics in Singapore took place on August 17. A total of 10 men competed in this event, limited to fighters whose body weight was less than 63 kilograms. Preliminaries started at 14:48, quarterfinals started at 16:10, semifinals at 19:02 and the final at 20:09. Two bronze medals were awarded at the Taekwondo competitions.

== Medalists ==
Gold	Byeong Deok Seo; South Korea
Silver	Mário Silva; Portugal
Bronze	Alejandro Valdés; Mexico
Bronze	Berk Sungu; Turkey

== Results ==
Legend

- PTG — Won by Points Gap
- SUP — Won by Superiority
- OT — Won on over time (Golden Point)

=== Main bracket ===
First round
Taha Madnini (LBA)	7
Alejandro Valdés (MEX)	8
Jehudiel Kiki (BEN)	0
Mário Silva (POR)	18

Quarterfinals
Konstantin Minin (RUS)	6
Alejandro Valdés (MEX)	8
Byeong Deok Seo (KOR)
Lamine Bagayogo (BUR)	RSC 3; 1:05
Marcin Anikiej (POL)	7
Berk Sungu (TUR)	10
Mário Silva (POR)	5
Vladislav Arventii (MDA)	3

Semifinals
Alejandro Valdés (MEX)	0
Byeong Deok Seo (KOR)	5
Berk Sungu (TUR)	3
Mário Silva (POR)	5

Final
Byeong Deok Seo (KOR)	9
Mário Silva (POR)	5
