= Sailing at the 2010 Summer Youth Olympics – Girls' Techno 293 =

Girls' Techno 293 class competition at the 2010 Summer Youth Olympics in Singapore took place from August 17 to August 25 at the National Sailing Centre. 18 sailors competed in this windsurfing competition.

Sixteen races were scheduled. However, due to bad weather conditions, only 10 races plus the Medal race were contested. Only the 9 best results along with the Medal race result were totaled for the final results.

== Medalists ==
Techno 293

Gold	Siripon Kaewduang-ngam; Thailand
Silver	Veronica Fanciulli; Italy
Bronze	Audrey Pei Lin Yong; Singapore

== Results ==
Race M is the medal race.

Rank	Athlete	Race											Net Points
Rank	Athlete	1	2	3	4	5	6	7	8	9	10	M	Net Points
1st place, gold medalist(s)	Siripon Kaewduang-ngam (THA)	1	~~9~~	1	9	2	1	1	1	1	1	4	22
2nd place, silver medalist(s)	Veronica Fanciulli (ITA)	2	3	9	12	1	~~OCS~~	3	2	2	4	1	39
3rd place, bronze medalist(s)	Audrey Pei Lin Yong (SIN)	4	1	4	~~8~~	4	2	7	6	4	8	3	43
4	Naomi Cohen (ISR)	3	2	2	4	6	~~OCS~~	2	8	6	5	8	46
5	Lara Lagoa (ESP)	6	5	~~10~~	2	8	4	4	7	3	2	5	46
6	Valentina Serigos (ARG)	5	~~6~~	3	3	5	6	5	3	5	3	9	47
7	Anastasiya Valkevich (BLR)	11	4	5	1	3	~~OCS~~	8	4	10	6	2	54
8	Hanna Idziak (POL)	7	7	6	5	9	3	~~10~~	10	7	7	6	67
9	Ka Kei Man (HKG)	8	10	7	7	7	~~OCS~~	6	5	9	9	10	78
10	Clidane Humeau (FRA)	10	8	~~11~~	6	11	5	11	9	11	11	12	94
11	Jade Rogers (GBR)	9	14	8	10	10	~~OCS~~	9	11	8	16	7	102
12	Diana Valera (MEX)	13	13	~~15~~	11	15	7	13	13	13	13	13	124
13	Shiori Yuri (JPN)	12	11	12	14	12	~~OCS~~	12	18	12	12	11	126
14	Wendy Richer Soares (BRA)	15	15	~~17~~	13	13	9	16	12	16	10	18	137
15	Andrea Vanhoorne (BEL)	14	12	16	15	14	8	14	14	~~DSQ~~	14	17	138
16	Margot Samson (USA)	16	16	14	16	16	10	15	15	17	~~DNC~~	14	149
17	Audrey Caron (CAN)	17	17	13	17	~~18~~	11	17	16	14	17	16	155
18	Josefina Roder (PER)	18	18	18	18	17	~~DNF~~	18	17	15	15	15	169

=== Notes ===
Scoring abbreviations are defined as follows:

- OCS – On the course side of the starting line
- DSQ – Disqualified
- DNF – did not finish
- DNS – did not start
- BFD – Black Flag disqualification
- RAF – Retired after finishing
