= Belgium at the 2010 Summer Youth Olympics =

- IOC code: BEL
- NOC: Belgian Olympic Committee
- Website: www.teambelgium.be

in Singapore
- Competitors: 52 in 16 sports
- Flag bearer: An-Sophie Mestach
- Medals Ranked 27th: Gold 2 Silver 1 Bronze 2 Total 5

Summer Youth Olympics appearances (overview)
- 2010; 2014; 2018

Belgium participated in the 2010 Summer Youth Olympics in Singapore.

The Belgian squad consisted of 52 athletes competing in 16 sports: aquatics (swimming), archery, athletics, canoeing, cycling, equestrian, gymnastics, hockey, judo, rowing, sailing, table tennis, taekwondo, tennis, triathlon and volleyball.

== Medalists ==
| Medal | Name | Sport | Event | Date |
|---|---|---|---|---|
| Gold | Nicola Philippaerts | Equestrian | Team jumping | 20 Aug |
| Gold | Lola Mansour | Judo | Girls' −78 kg | 23 Aug |
| Gold | Belgium girls' volleyball team: Delfien Brugman; Valerie El Houssine; Laura Heyrman; Laurine Klinkenberg; Tara Lauwers; Lotte Penders; Elien Ruysschaert; Ilka Van de Vyver; Lore Van den Vonder; Mira Juwet; Sophie Van Nimmen; Karolien Vleugels | Volleyball | Girls | 26 Aug |
| Silver | Toma Nikiforov | Judo | Boys' −100 kg | 23 Aug |
| Silver | Lola Mansour | Judo | Mixed team | 25 Aug |
| Bronze | An-Sophie Mestach | Tennis | Girls' doubles | 21 Aug |
| Bronze | Hermien Peters | Canoeing | Canoe sprint girls | 22 Aug |
| Bronze | Belgium Boys' Field Hockey Team: Arnaud Flamand; Dimitri Cuvelier; Arthur Van Doren; Matthias Dubois; Antoine Legrain; Louis Rombouts; Dorian Thiery; Thomas Vander Gracht; Alexander Hendrickx; Bjorn Delmoitie; Nicolas De Kerpel; Mathew Cobbaert; Quentin Bigare; Gaetan Perez; Benjamin van Dam; Arno Devreker | Hockey | Boys | 25 Aug |

== Archery ==
| Athlete | Events | Ranking round | | Round of 32 | Round of 16 | Quarterfinals | Semifinals | Final | |
| Athlete | Events | Score | Seed | Opposition Score | Opposition Score | Opposition Score | Opposition Score | Opposition Score | Rank |
|---|---|---|---|---|---|---|---|---|---|
| Zoé Gobbels | Individual | 603 | 12th | Wojnicka (POL); W 7—1 | Verma (IND); W 7—3 | Avitia (MEX); L 2—6 | Did not advance | | 6 |
| Zoé Gobbels | Mixed team (w/ Frantisek Hajduk (CZE)) | 1206 | 10th | Hul (BLR) & Luo (CHN); L 2–6 | Did not advance | | | | 17 |

== Athletics ==
| Athlete | Events | Qualifying round | | Final | |
| Athlete | Events | Result | Rank | Result | Rank |
|---|---|---|---|---|---|
| Arnaud Art | Boys' Pole vault | 4m70 | 6th Q | 4m85 | 6th |
| Bram Ghuys | Boys' high jump | 2m10 | 1st Q | 2m14 PB | 5th |

== Canoeing ==
| Athlete | Event | Time trial | | Round 1 | Repechage | Round 3 | Round 4 | Round 5 | Medal race | Medal |
| Athlete | Event | Time | Rank | Opposition Result | Opposition Result | Opposition Result | Opposition Result | Opposition Result | Opposition Result | Medal |
|---|---|---|---|---|---|---|---|---|---|---|
| Hermien Peters | Girls' K1 sprint | 1:42.67 | 4th | (Tunisia) Ben Ismail Afef; W 1:44.99-2:02.07 | | (Ukraine) Mariya Kichasova; W 1:43.27-1:46.00 | (Poland) Joanna Bruska; W 1:44.52-1:44.58 | (Hungary) Ramona Farkasdi; L 1:53.49-1:41.42 | (Spain) Maria Elena Monleon; W 1:46.76-1:49.11 | Bronze medal |
| Hermien Peters | Girls' K1 slalom | 1:48.36 | 9th | (China) Huang Jieyi; W 1:46.14-2:05.78 | | (Singapore) Nan Feng Wang; W 1:46.85-1:51.87 | (Australia) Jessica Fox; L 1:46.52-1:34.61 | Did not advance | | |

== Cycling ==
Cross country

| Athlete | Event | Time | Rank | Points |
|---|---|---|---|---|
| Laurens Sweeck | Boys' cross country | 1:00:01 | 3 | 17 |
| Tori Van de Perre | Girls' cross country | 58:03 | 19 | 40 |

Time trial

| Athlete | Event | Time | Rank | Points |
|---|---|---|---|---|
| Boris Vallee | Boys' time trial | 4:06.68 | 6 | 14 |
| Tori Van de Perre | Girls' time trial | 3:53.78 | 28 | 40 |

BMX

| Athlete | Event | Seeding round | | Quarterfinals | | | | | | | Semifinals | | | | | | | Final | | |
| Athlete | Event | Seeding round | | Run 1 | | Run 2 | | Run 3 | | Rank | Run 1 | | Run 2 | | Run 3 | | Rank | Final | | |
| Athlete | Event | Time | Rank | Time | Rank | Time | Rank | Time | Rank | Rank | Time | Rank | Time | Rank | Time | Rank | Rank | Time | Rank | Points |
|---|---|---|---|---|---|---|---|---|---|---|---|---|---|---|---|---|---|---|---|---|
| Mattias Somers | Boys' BMX | 34.371 | 19 | 33.614 | 3 | 34.313 | 5 | 34.158 | 5 | 5 | Did not advance | | | | | | | | | 72 |
| Tori Van de Perre | Girls' BMX | 38.180 | 6 | 38.554 | 2 | 39.441 | 2 | 39.016 | 2 | 2 Q | 39.197 | 3 | 39.144 | 3 | 39.727 | 3 | 3 Q | 38.060 | 6 | 18 |

Road race

| Athlete | Event | Time | Rank | Points |
|---|---|---|---|---|
| Boris Vallee | Boys' road race | 1:05:42 | 1 | -4* |
| Laurens Sweeck | Boys' road race | 1:05:44 | 29 | |
| Mattias Somers | Boys' road race | 1:16:48 | 66 | |

Overall

| Team | Event | Cross country pts | | Time trial pts | | BMX pts | | Road race Pts | Total | Rank |
| Team | Event | Boys | Girls | Boys | Girls | Boys | Girls | Road race Pts | Total | Rank |
|---|---|---|---|---|---|---|---|---|---|---|
| Tori Van de Perre; Laurens Sweeck; Boris Vallee; Mattias Somers | Mixed team | 17 | 40 | 14 | 40 | 72 | 18 | -4* | 197 | 4 |

- * Received −5 for finishing road race with all three racers

== Equestrian ==
| Athlete | horse | Event | Round 1 | | | Round 2 | | | Total | Jump-Off | | Rank |
| Athlete | horse | Event | Penalties | | Rank | Penalties | | Rank | Total | Penalties | Time | Rank |
| Athlete | horse | Event | Jump | Time | Rank | Jump | Time | Rank | Total | Penalties | Time | Rank |
|---|---|---|---|---|---|---|---|---|---|---|---|---|
| Nicola Philippaerts | Gippsland Girl | Individual jumping | 8 | 0 | 16 | 12 | 0 | 24 | 20 | | | 23 |
| Martin Fuchs (SUI); Wojciech Dahlke (POL); Valentina Isoardi (ITA); Carian Scudamore (GBR); Nicola Philippaerts (BEL) | Midnight Mist; Travelling Soldior; Alloria Thomas; Mighty Mcgyver; Gippsland Girl | Team jumping | 0; ~~12~~; ~~28~~; 0; 4 | 0; ~~0~~; ~~0~~; 0; 0 | 1 | 0; 4; ~~16~~; 0; ~~4~~ | 0; 0; ~~0~~; 0; ~~0~~ | 2 | 8 | 0; 0; ~~24~~; 4; ~~DNS~~ | 45.30; 49.19; ~~54.92~~; 46.54; ~~DNS~~ | Gold medal |

== Gymnastics ==
=== Artistic gymnastics ===
Boys

| Athlete | Event | Floor | | Pommel horse | | Rings | | Vault | | Parallel bars | | Horizontal bar | | Total | |
| Athlete | Event | Score | Rank | Score | Rank | Score | Rank | Score | Rank | Score | Rank | Score | Rank | Score | Rank |
|---|---|---|---|---|---|---|---|---|---|---|---|---|---|---|---|
| Thomas Neuteleers | Boys' qualification | 14.200 | 5 Q | 12.650 | 26 | 13.900 | 11 | 14.750 | 31 | 14.200 | 5 Q | 13.800 | 11 | 83.500 | 8 Q |
| Thomas Neuteleers | Boys' individual all-around | 14.150 | 4 | 11.850 | 16 | 13.550 | 10 | 14.800 | 13 | 13.950 | 5 | 13.550 | 7 | 81.850 | 10 |

| Athlete | Event | Score | Rank |
|---|---|---|---|
| Thomas Neuteleers | Boys' floor | 13.850 | 4 |
| Thomas Neuteleers | Boys' parallel Bars | 13.775 | 5 |

Girls

| Athlete | Event | Vault | | Uneven bars | | Beam | | Floor | | Total | |
| Athlete | Event | Score | Rank | Score | Rank | Score | Rank | Score | Rank | Score | Rank |
|---|---|---|---|---|---|---|---|---|---|---|---|
| Eline Vandersteen | Girls' qualification | 13.400 | 16 | 11.500 | 26 | 12.750 | 18 | 11.700 | 31 | 49.350 | 25 |

== Hockey ==
| Squad list | Event | Group stage | | Bronze-medal match | |
| Squad list | Event | Opposition Score | Rank | Opposition Score | Rank |
|---|---|---|---|---|---|
| Arnaud Flamand; Dimitri Cuvelier (C); Arthur Van Doren; Matthias Dubois; Antoine Legrain; Louis Rombouts; Dorian Thiery; Thomas Vander Gracht; Alexander Hendrickx; Bjorn Delmoitie; Nicolas De Kerpel; Mathew Cobbaert; Quentin Bigare; Gaetan Perez; Benjamin van Dam; Arno Devreker | Boys' Hockey | Chile; W 9–0 | 3 | Ghana; W 4–1 | Bronze medal |
| Arnaud Flamand; Dimitri Cuvelier (C); Arthur Van Doren; Matthias Dubois; Antoine Legrain; Louis Rombouts; Dorian Thiery; Thomas Vander Gracht; Alexander Hendrickx; Bjorn Delmoitie; Nicolas De Kerpel; Mathew Cobbaert; Quentin Bigare; Gaetan Perez; Benjamin van Dam; Arno Devreker | Boys' Hockey | Singapore; W 7–1 | 3 | Ghana; W 4–1 | Bronze medal |
| Arnaud Flamand; Dimitri Cuvelier (C); Arthur Van Doren; Matthias Dubois; Antoine Legrain; Louis Rombouts; Dorian Thiery; Thomas Vander Gracht; Alexander Hendrickx; Bjorn Delmoitie; Nicolas De Kerpel; Mathew Cobbaert; Quentin Bigare; Gaetan Perez; Benjamin van Dam; Arno Devreker | Boys' Hockey | Australia; L 3–6 | 3 | Ghana; W 4–1 | Bronze medal |
| Arnaud Flamand; Dimitri Cuvelier (C); Arthur Van Doren; Matthias Dubois; Antoine Legrain; Louis Rombouts; Dorian Thiery; Thomas Vander Gracht; Alexander Hendrickx; Bjorn Delmoitie; Nicolas De Kerpel; Mathew Cobbaert; Quentin Bigare; Gaetan Perez; Benjamin van Dam; Arno Devreker | Boys' Hockey | Ghana; W 6–3 | 3 | Ghana; W 4–1 | Bronze medal |
| Arnaud Flamand; Dimitri Cuvelier (C); Arthur Van Doren; Matthias Dubois; Antoine Legrain; Louis Rombouts; Dorian Thiery; Thomas Vander Gracht; Alexander Hendrickx; Bjorn Delmoitie; Nicolas De Kerpel; Mathew Cobbaert; Quentin Bigare; Gaetan Perez; Benjamin van Dam; Arno Devreker | Boys' Hockey | Pakistan; L 2–3 | 3 | Ghana; W 4–1 | Bronze medal |

== Judo ==
Individual

| Athlete | Event | Round of 16 | Quarterfinals | Semifinals | Gold medal Final | |
| Athlete | Event | Opposition Result | Opposition Result | Opposition Result | Opposition Result | Rank |
|---|---|---|---|---|---|---|
| Lola Mansour | Girls' −78 kg | (Serbia) Una Svetlana Tuba; W 001—000 | (Bosnia and Herzegovina) Milica Savic; W 101—000 | (Slovenia) Urska Potocnik; W 002—000 | (Germany) Natalia Kubin; W 001—000 | 1st place, gold medalist(s) |
| Toma Nikiforov | Boys' −100 kg | (Kyrgyzstan) Bolot Toktogonov; W 021—000 | (Iran) Shayan Nasirpourdizaji; W 020—001 | (Germany) Marius Piepke; W 101—000 | (Japan) Ryosuke Igarashi; L 000—002 | 2nd place, silver medalist(s) |

Team

| Team | Event | Round 1 | Round 2 | Semifinals | Final | Rank |
| Team | Event | Opposition Result | Opposition Result | Opposition Result | Opposition Result | Rank |
|---|---|---|---|---|---|---|
| Belgrade; Anna Dmitrieva (RUS); Jeremy Saywell (MLT); Jennet Geldybayeva (TKM); Babacar Cisse (SEN); Haley Baxter (NZL); Dulguun Otgonbayar (MGL); Lola Mansour (BEL); Marius Piepke (GER) | Mixed team | BYE | Osaka; W 4–4 (3–1) | Tokyo; W 5–3 | Essen; L 1–6 | Silver medal |

== Rowing ==
| Athlete | Event | Heats | | Repechage | | Semifinals C/D | | Final C | |
| Athlete | Event | Time | Rank | Time | Rank | Time | Rank | Time | Rank |
|---|---|---|---|---|---|---|---|---|---|
| Eveline Peleman | Girls' single sculls | 3:57.23 | 11th QR | 4:08.69 | 16th QC | 4:16.25 | 18th QC | 4:12.33 | 16th |
| Jean-Benoît Valschaerts | Boys' single sculls | 3:28.79 | 11th QR | 3:35.50 | 14th QC | 3:46.62 | 17th QC | 3:35.95 | 14th |

== Sailing ==
| Athlete | Event | Race | | | | | | | | | | | | | | | | Net points | Final rank |
| Athlete | Event | 1 | 2 | 3 | 4 | 5 | 6 | 7 | 8 | 9 | 10 | 11 | 12 | 13 | 14 | 15 | M* | Net points | Final rank |
|---|---|---|---|---|---|---|---|---|---|---|---|---|---|---|---|---|---|---|---|
| Andrea Vanhoorne | Girls' windsurfing (Techno 293) | 14 | 12 | 16 | 15 | 14 | 8 | 14 | 14 | ~~DSQ~~ | 14 | Cancelled | | | | | 17 | 138 | 15th |

== Swimming ==
Boys'

| Athlete | Events | Heat | | Semifinal | | Final | |
| Athlete | Events | Time | Rank | Time | Rank | Time | Rank |
|---|---|---|---|---|---|---|---|
| Bastien Soret | 200 m medley | 2:08.80 | 20th | | | Did not advance | |
| Bastien Soret | 100 m backstroke | 59.15 | 21st | Did not advance | | | |
| Bastien Soret | 200 m backstroke | 2:09.56 | 16th | | | Did not advance | |

Girls'

| Athlete | Events | Heat | | Semifinal | | Final | |
| Athlete | Events | Time | Rank | Time | Rank | Time | Rank |
|---|---|---|---|---|---|---|---|
| Sarah Wegria | 50 m freestyle | Did not start (broken wrist) | | Did not advance | | | |
| Sarah Wegria | 100 m freestyle | 57.55 | 6th Q | 58.23 | 15th | Did not advance | |
| Sarah Wegria | 200 m freestyle | Did not start (broken wrist) | | | | Did not advance | |
| Jolien Vermeylen | 200 m medley | 2:22.66 | 12th | | | Did not advance | |
| Jolien Vermeylen | 100 m breaststroke | 1:13.85 | 19th | Did not advance | | | |
| Jolien Vermeylen | 200 m backstroke | 2:35.13 | 7th Q | | | 2:34.20 | 7th |

== Table tennis ==
| Athlete | Event | Round 1 | | | | Round 2 | | | | Quarterfinals | Semifinals | Final |
| Athlete | Event | Opposition Result | Opposition Result | Opposition Result | Rank | Opposition Result | Opposition Result | Opposition Result | Rank | Opposition Result | Opposition Result | Opposition Result |
|---|---|---|---|---|---|---|---|---|---|---|---|---|
| Emilien Vanrossomme | Boys' singles | (India) A Das; W 3—0 | (Italy) L Mutti; W 3—1 | (Austria) S Leitgeb; W 3—1 | 1st Q | (North Korea) K S Kim; W 3—1 | (Chinese Taipei) T-H Hung; L 1—3 | (Czech Republic) O Bajger; W 3—2 | 2nd Q | (France) S Gauzy; L 1—4 | Did not advance | |
| Emilien Vanrossomme | Mixed team (w/ Marla Xiao (POR)) | (Australia) L Phan (El Salvador) L Mejia; W 3—0 | (France) C Pang (France) S Gauzy; L 1—2 | (Slovenia) A Galic (Austria) S Leitgeb; W 3—0 | 2nd Q | (China) Y Gu (Tunisia) Adem Hmam; L 1—2 | | | | Did not advance | | |

== Taekwondo ==
| Athlete | Event | Preliminary | Quarterfinal | Semifinal | Final | Rank |
|---|---|---|---|---|---|---|
| Nikki Pauwels | Girls' −44kg | Did not participate (ill) | | | | |

== Tennis ==
| Athlete | Event | Round of 32 | | Round of 16 | | Quarterfinals | | Semifinals | | Bronze medal match | |
| Athlete | Event | Opposition | Score | Opposition | Score | Opposition | Score | Opposition | Score | Opposition | Score |
|---|---|---|---|---|---|---|---|---|---|---|---|
| An-Sophie Mestach | Girls' singles | (Canada) M Jodoin | 6–2; 6–0 | (Russia) Y Putintseva | 4–6; 0–6 | Did not advance | | | | | |
| An-Sophie Mestach | Girls' doubles (w/ Tímea Babos (HUN)) | | | (Madagascar) N Rasolomalala (Madagascar) Z Razafimahatratra | 6–1; 6–3 | (Japan) S Ishizu (Japan) E Mutaguchi | 4–6; 6–3; 14–12 | (China) H Tang (China) S Zheng | 6–3; 3–6; 7–10 | (Russia) D Gavrilova (Russia) Y Putintseva | 6—2; 6—2 (bronze) |

== Triathlon ==
Boys'

| Athlete | Event | Swim (.75 km) | Trans 1 | Bike (20 km) | Trans 2 | Run (5 km) | Total | Rank |
|---|---|---|---|---|---|---|---|---|
| Thomas Jurgens | Individual | 8:38 | 0:30 | 28:44 | 0:25 | 19:18 | 57:35.16 | 17th |

Girls'

| Athlete | Event | Swim (.75 km) | Trans 1 | Bike (20 km) | Trans 2 | Run (5 km) | Total | Rank |
|---|---|---|---|---|---|---|---|---|
| Charlotte Deldaele | Individual | 9:34 | 0:34 | 34:22 | 0:25 | 20:29 | 1:05:24.66 | 16th |

Mixed

| Athlete | Event | Total times per athlete (swim 250 m, bike 7 km, run 1.7 km) | Total group time | Rank |
|---|---|---|---|---|
| Charlotte Deldaele (BEL); Andriy Sirenko (UKR); Raquel Mafra Rocha (POR); Diego Paz (ESP) | Mixed team relay Europe 5 | 20:48; 19:26; 23:05; 20:30 | 1:23:49.96 | 10th |
| Annie Thoren (SWE); Thomas Jurgens (BEL); Elinor Thorogood (GBR); Andrew Hood (GBR) | Mixed team relay Europe 4 | 21:11; 19:08; 22:04; 20:31 | 1:22:54.12 | 7th |

== Volleyball ==
| Squad list | Event | Preliminary | | Semifinal | Final | Rank |
| Squad list | Event | Group B | Rank | Semifinal | Final | Rank |
|---|---|---|---|---|---|---|
| Delfien Brugman; Valerie El Houssine; Laura Heyrman; Laurine Klinkenberg; Tara Lauwers; Lotte Penders; Elien Ruysschaert; Ilka Van de Vyver; Lore Van den Vonder; Mira Juwet; Sophie Van Nimmen; Karolien Vleugels | Girls' volleyball | Egypt; W 3–0 (25–11, 25–12, 25–10) | 2nd Q | Peru; W 3–1 (25–19, 19–25, 25–21, 25–22) | United States; W 3–1 (17–25, 25–20, 25–18, 25–12) | 1st place, gold medalist(s) |
| Delfien Brugman; Valerie El Houssine; Laura Heyrman; Laurine Klinkenberg; Tara Lauwers; Lotte Penders; Elien Ruysschaert; Ilka Van de Vyver; Lore Van den Vonder; Mira Juwet; Sophie Van Nimmen; Karolien Vleugels | Girls' volleyball | United States; L 2—3 (22–25, 25–15, 20–25, 25–18, 11–15) | 2nd Q | Peru; W 3–1 (25–19, 19–25, 25–21, 25–22) | United States; W 3–1 (17–25, 25–20, 25–18, 25–12) | 1st place, gold medalist(s) |
