= Judo at the 2010 Summer Youth Olympics – Boys' 100 kg =

Judo competition

The Boys' 100 kg tournament in Judo at the 2010 Summer Youth Olympics was held on August 23 at the International Convention Centre.

This event was the heaviest of the boy's judo weight classes, limiting competitors to a maximum of 100 kilograms of body mass. The tournament bracket consisted of a single-elimination contest culminating in a gold medal match. There was also a repechage to determine the winners of the two bronze medals. Each judoka who had lost before the finals competed in the repechage with the two finalists getting bronze medals.

== Medalists ==
Gold	Ryosuke Igarashi; Japan
Silver	Toma Nikiforov; Belgium
Bronze	Marius Piepke; Germany
Bronze	Bolot Toktogonov; Kyrgyzstan

== Results ==
=== Main Bracket ===
Round of 16
Pedro Pineda (VEN)	021
Bruno Abel Villalba (ARG)	000
Mateja Glusac (SRB)	000
Yacov Mamistvalov (ISR)	100
Bolot Toktogonov (KGZ)	000
Toma Nikiforov (BEL)	021

Quarterfinals
Pedro Pineda (VEN)	000
Ryosuke Igarashi (JPN)	021
Alex Maxell Garcia Mendoza (CUB)	001
Yacov Mamistvalov (ISR)	000
Shayan Nasirpourdizaji (IRI)	001
Toma Nikiforov (BEL)	020
Fernando Vanoye (MEX)	000
Marius Piepke (GER)	001

Semifinals
Ryosuke Igarashi (JPN)	100
Alex Maxell Garcia Mendoza (CUB)	000
Toma Nikiforov (BEL)	101
Marius Piepke (GER)	000

Finals
Ryosuke Igarashi (JPN)	002
Toma Nikiforov (BEL)	000

=== Repechage ===
First round
Bruno Abel Villalba (ARG)	BYE
Mateja Glusac (SRB)	BYE
Bolot Toktogonov (KGZ)	BYE

Second round
Bruno Abel Villalba (ARG)	000
Yacov Mamistvalov (ISR)	100
Mateja Glusac (SRB)	100
Pedro Pineda (VEN)	000
Bolot Toktogonov (KGZ)	101
Fernando Vanoye (MEX)	001
Shayan Nasirpourdizaji (IRI)	BYE

Third round
Yacov Mamistvalov (ISR)	000
Mateja Glusac (SRB)	100
Bolot Toktogonov (KGZ)	001
Shayan Nasirpourdizaji (IRI)	000

Bronze Medal Finals
Mateja Glusac (SRB)	000
Marius Piepke (GER)	001
Bolot Toktogonov (KGZ)	010
Alex Maxell Garcia Mendoza (CUB)	001
