= Gymnastics at the 2010 Summer Youth Olympics – Women's floor =

These are the results of the women's floor exercise competition, one of five events for female competitors of the artistic gymnastics discipline contested in the gymnastics at the 2010 Summer Youth Olympics in Singapore. The qualification and final rounds took place on August 17 at the Bishan Sports Hall.

== Medalists ==
Gold	Silver	Bronze
Tan Sixin; China	Diana Bulimar; Romania	Viktoria Komova; Russia

== Results ==
=== Qualification ===
42 gymnasts competed in the floor exercise event in the artistic gymnastics qualification round on August 17. The eight highest scoring gymnasts advanced to the final on August 22.

=== Final ===
Rank	Gymnast	A-score	B-score	Penalty	Total
Gold medal	Tan Sixin (CHN)	5.5	9.025	—	14.525
Silver medal	Diana Bulimar (ROU)	5.5	8.825	—	14.325
Bronze medal	Viktoria Komova (RUS)	5.7	8.475	—	14.175
4	Ana Sofía Gómez (GUA)	5.3	8.400	—	13.700
5	Jessica Hogg (GBR)	5.0	8.600	—	13.600
6	Tess Moonen (NED)	5.2	8.375	—	13.575
7	Jonna Adlerteg (SWE)	4.9	8.375	—	13.275
8	Carlotta Ferlito (ITA)	5.1	8.100	0.3	12.900
