= Mattia Furlan =

Italian BMX rider (born 1993)

Personal information
- Born: 5 June 1993 (age 33) Vicenza, Italy
- Height: 175 cm (5 ft 9 in)
- Weight: 80 kg (176 lb)

Cycling career
- Sport: Cycling
- Current team: Italy
- Discipline: BMX racing
- Role: Rider

Mattia Furlan (born 5 June 1993) is an Italian male BMX rider, representing his nation at international competitions. He competed in the time trial event at the 2015 UCI BMX World Championships.
