= Niklas Laustsen =

Danish BMX rider (born 1992)

Personal information
- Born: 30 August 1992 (age 34) Hadsund, Denmark
- Height: 1.86 m (6 ft 1 in)
- Weight: 90 kg (198 lb)

Cycling career
- Sport: Cycling
- Current team: Denmark
- Discipline: BMX racing
- Role: Rider

Niklas Laustsen (born 30 August 1992 in Hadsund) is a Danish male BMX rider, representing his nation at international competitions. He competed in the time trial event at the 2015 UCI BMX World Championships.
