= Christopher Mireles =

Mexican BMX rider (born 1992)

Personal information
- Full name: Christopher Mireles Suazo
- Nickname: Chris
- Born: 25 November 1992 (age 33) Guadalajara, Jalisco, Mexico

Cycling career
- Sport: Cycling
- Current team: Mexico
- Discipline: BMX racing
- Role: Rider
Medal record
Representing Mexico
Men's BMX racing
Central American and Caribbean Games
Bronze medal – third place	2014 Veracruz	BMX racing

Christopher Mireles Suazo (Note: In this Spanish name, the first or paternal surname is Mireles and the second or maternal family name is Suazo.) (born 25 November 1992) is a Mexican BMX rider, representing his nation at international competitions. He competed in the time trial event at the 2015 UCI BMX World Championships.

Mireles also competed at the 2010 Summer Youth Olympics, the 2011 Pan American Games, the 2014 Central American and Caribbean Games, and the 2015 Pan American Games.
