= Tampines Bike Park =

Sports venue in Tampines, Singapore

Coordinates: 1.362005°N 103.942959°E

- Location within Singapore
- Location: Tampines, Singapore
- Area: 60 hectares (600,000 m^{2})
- Created: 2006; 20 years ago
- Opened: 2006; 20 years ago
- Closed: 17 September 2014; 12 years ago
- Designer: DirTraction
- Status: Demolished

Tampines Bike Park was formerly located in the eastern part of Singapore, in the Tampines Regional Centre. Just one kilometre away from Tampines Mall, the entrance of the park and the parking lot are located along Tampines Avenue 9 at the junction of Tampines Avenue 7. In May 2013, it was reported that the Tampines Bike Park will be cleared for development into a new town, less than 3 years after it was presented to Singaporeans as a legacy of the inaugural 2010 Summer Youth Olympics held in Singapore. It closed in 2014.

== History ==
Situated on a 60-hectare site in 2006 by mountain-biking organisation DirTraction and the contractor company RMC Pte Ltd, the current Mountain Bike trail is ten-kilometre long and offers several climbs as well as a challenging contour line rides. The trail hosted the Phat Tyre Sunday Mountain Bike Race in 2007, involving more than 260 participants from Indonesia, Malaysia, the Philippines and Singapore.

The trail system is being upgraded to make it even more technically challenging, and in 2008, the bike park hosted BikeAsia100, a 100km mountain biking marathon race, and subsequently eneloop mountain bike carnival in 2009 with its marquee event, a 100km night mountain biking marathon race, one of the first around the region.

These mountain biking marathon event attracted riders from the region, bringing close to 700 participants in the 2009 edition.

The BMX portion of the park is currently used for dirt jumping by BMX enthusiasts. It is being developed into a full-scaled BMX race track for local community use and to host major international events.

The start and finish areas of the mountain bike and BMX courses in the bike park will be adjacent to one another, allowing the spectators the best possible view of both events.

== 2010 Summer Youth Olympics ==
Tampines Bike Park was used as a competition venue for cycling (BMX and Mountain Bike) during the 2010 Summer Youth Olympics. Speaking of the Tampines Bike Park as well as numerous venues and facilities that were specially built for the Youth Olympics, then Minister for Community Development, Dr Vivian Balakrishnan, assured Singaporeans that there'll be no white elephants after the Youth Olympics were over as local athletes, sportsmen and weekend sports enthusiasts can use the facilities. However, less than 3 years after the inaugural Youth Olympics in 2010, the HDB announced in May 2013 that earthworks had begun at the Tampines Bike Park to clear it for a new town instead.

== Closure ==
The Tampines Bike Park was closed to make way for the future developments of the Tampines North New Town, which will be an extension of the existing Tampines New Town. The Bike Park had its last day of operations on 14 September 2014. Plans for a new BMX track to replace the one in Tampines is currently undergoing discussion and planning. The Tampines Bike Park then officially closes on the 17 September 2014.
