= Gymnastics at the 2010 Summer Youth Olympics – Men's artistic qualification =

Qualifications for Boy's artistic gymnastic competitions at the 2010 Summer Youth Olympics was held at the Bishan Sports Hall on August 16, 2010. The results of the qualification determined the qualifiers to the finals: 18 gymnasts in the all-around final, and 8 gymnasts in each of 6 apparatus finals. For the vault, the athlete must perform two vaults though only the first only is counted towards the score, also not everyone participated in a second jump.

== Qualification results ==
Gymnast	Floor Exercise		Pommel Horse		Rings		Vault		Parallel Bars		Horizontal Bar		Total (All-around)	
Gymnast	Score	Rank	Score	Rank	Score	Rank	Score	Rank	Score	Rank	Score	Rank	Score	Rank
Yuya Kamoto (JPN)	14.500	2	13.650	5	14.500	2	15.750	5	14.850	1	13.950	5	87.200	1
Sam Oldham (GBR)	14.350	4	14.300	2	13.900	10	15.600	10	14.250	4	14.450	1	86.860	2
Oleg Stepko (UKR)	14.400	3	14.550	1	14.050	5	15.700	6	14.300	3	13.800	9	86.800	3
Xiaodong Zhu (CHN)	14.600	1	13.600	9	14.200	3	15.900	1	13.650	12	14.150	3	86.100	4
Daniil Kazachkov (RUS)	13.800	13	13.950	3	14.100	4	15.800	3	13.900	7	13.850	7	85.400	5
Andrei Muntean (ROU)	13.950	10	13.650	6	14.700	1	15.700	7	14.400	2	11.400	39	83.800	6
Ernesto Vila Sarria (CUB)	14.100	7	13.400	14	12.700	30	15.650	9	14.050	6	13.900	6	83.800	7
Thomas Neuteleers (BEL)	14.200	5	12.650	26	13.900	11	14.750	31	14.200	5	13.800	11	83.500	8
Ludovico Edalli (ITA)	13.750	17	13.450	13	13.400	22	14.800	28	13.900	8	13.800	10	83.100	9
Vahan Vardanyan (ARM)	13.600	19	13.500	11	13.900	9	14.950	22	13.150	20	13.450	14	82.550	10
Robert Watson (CAN)	13.850	12	12.900	24	13.500	20	14.950	24	13.850	9	13.300	18	82.350	11
Nikolaos Iliopoulos (GRE)	12.400	36	13.700	4	13.850	12	15.400	15	13.350	18	13.500	13	82.200	12
Eduard Shaulov (UZB)	13.800	15	13.500	12	12.100	35	15.500	12	13.600	13	13.250	21	81.750	13
Levente Vagner (HUN)	13.250	27	13.650	7	13.600	17	14.650	35	13.600	14	12.850	27	81.600	14
Daniel Weinert (GER)	13.850	11	13.050	20	13.100	28	14.650	36	13.650	11	13.300	16	81.600	15
Michalis Krasias (CYP)	13.600	20	13.200	17	13.800	13	14.700	33	12.850	24	13.300	17	81.450	16
Brandon Prost (FRA)	13.350	23	13.050	21	13.250	24	14.600	37	13.700	10	13.150	22	81.100	17
Amr Ahmed (EGY)	13.350	25	13.600	10	13.150	26	14.900	26	12.750	26	13.300	19	81.050	18
Oliver Hegi (SUI)	12.300	38	13.400	16	13.650	16	15.350	16	12.550	27	13.750	12	81.000	19
Jesse Glenn (USA)	13.800	14	11.750	32	14.000	7	15.650	8	12.300	30	13.150	23	80.650	20
Arthur Mariano (BRA)	13.500	22	13.150	18	11.950	37	15.350	17	13.450	16	13.250	20	80.650	21
Yeonggwang Jo (KOR)	13.350	24	11.900	29	13.750	15	14.950	25	13.150	21	13.350	15	80.450	22
Robert Tvorogal (LTU)	13.200	28	13.050	22	12.050	36	14.850	27	13.100	22	14.150	2	80.400	23
Vasili Mikhalitsyn (BLR)	13.300	26	13.600	8	13.300	23	13.900	39	13.550	15	12.700	28	80.350	24
Weena Chokpaoumpai (THA)	14.050	9	12.550	27	13.200	25	15.100	19	12.750	25	12.450	31	80.100	25
Ferhat Arıcan (TUR)	12.650	33	13.400	15	13.550	19	15.400	14	11.950	35	13.050	24	80.000	26
Brody-Jai Hennessy (AUS)	12.400	37	11.700	33	13.750	14	14.950	23	13.250	19	13.800	8	79.850	27
Néstor Abad (ESP)	14.100	6	10.200	39	14.050	6	15.800	2	11.500	37	14.100	4	79.750	28
Junior Rojo (VEN)	13.600	21	11.800	31	13.450	21	15.000	21	13.350	17	12.300	35	79.500	29
Javier Cervantes (MEX)	12.700	32	12.150	28	13.550	18	15.800	4	12.500	28	12.500	30	79.200	30
Filip Borosa (CRO)	14.050	8	12.950	23	12.450	31	14.750	30	12.400	29	11.900	38	78.500	31
Viktor Kocherin (KAZ)	12.600	34	13.100	19	12.400	32	15.550	11	12.050	34	12.400	32	78.100	32
Ryan Patterson (RSA)	12.800	31	11.350	35	12.850	29	14.700	32	13.050	23	12.950	26	77.700	33
Karl Kosztka (NED)	13.750	16	11.200	36	13.100	27	14.800	29	11.650	36	12.400	33	76.900	34
Ahmed Aldayani (QAT)	11.650	40	12.850	25	11.650	38	15.100	20	12.150	32	12.600	29	75.900	35
Timothy Tay (SIN)	13.200	29	11.550	34	12.250	33	14.100	38	12.150	31	12.100	37	75.350	36
Ganbatyn Erdenebold (MGL)	12.250	39	11.850	30	13.950	8	15.450	13	12.050	33	9.750	41	75.300	37
Ismael Sanabria (PUR)	13.750	18	8.650	41	12.150	34	15.200	18	11.050	39	13.000	25	73.800	38
Naimi Mechkour (ALG)	12.850	30	10.450	38	11.250	39	14.700	34	11.100	38	12.200	36	72.550	39
Adham Alsqour (JOR)	12.500	35	9.350	40	10.900	40	13.050	41	10.450	40	12.400	34	68.650	40
Lukasz Borkowski (POL)	0.000	41	11.050	37	0.000	41	13.900	40	0.000	41	10.800	40	35.750	41
