= Twan van Gendt =

Dutch racing cyclist (born 1992)

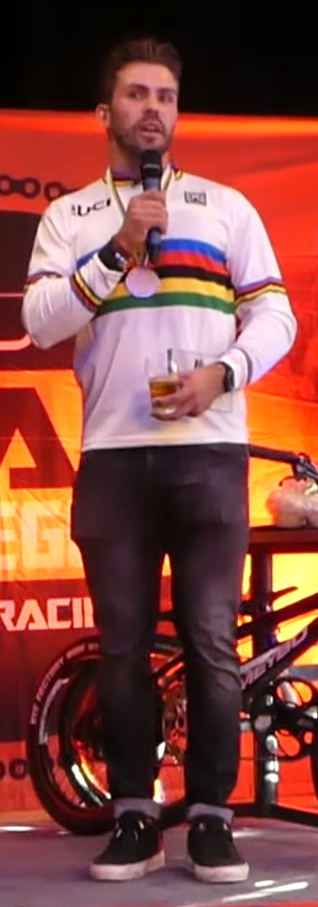
- Twan van Gendt in 2019

Personal information
- Born: 9 June 1992 (age 34) 's-Hertogenbosch, Netherlands

Cycling career
- Sport: Cycling
- Current team: Netherlands
- Discipline: BMX racing
- Role: Rider
Medal record
Men's BMX racing
Representing Netherlands
Event	1st	2nd	3rd
World Championships	1	0	0
World Junior Championships	0	0	1
World Cup	0	0	2
European Games	0	1	0
European Championships	1	2	0
Total	2	3	3
World Championships
Gold medal – first place	2019 Heusden-Zolder	BMX racing
World Cup
Bronze medal – third place	2012	BMX racing
Bronze medal – third place	2014	BMX racing
European Games
Silver medal – second place	2015 Baku	BMX racing
European Championships
Gold medal – first place	2015 Erp	BMX racing
Silver medal – second place	2017 Bordeaux	BMX racing
Silver medal – second place	2019 Valmiera	BMX racing
World Junior Championships
Bronze medal – third place	2010 Pietermaritzburg	BMX racing

Twan van Gendt (born 9 June 1992 in 's-Hertogenbosch) is a Dutch racing cyclist who represents the Netherlands in BMX. He was selected to represent the Netherlands at the 2012 Summer Olympics in the men's BMX event, where he placed 5th in the final. In June 2015, he competed in the inaugural European Games, for the Netherlands in cycling, more specifically, Men's BMX. He earned a silver medal.

Twan competed at the 2016 Summer Olympic Games in the men's BMX competition, where he placed 9th.

After the 2016 Olympic Games, Twan battled with a knee injury in 2017 and didn't compete for 5 months. He returned to competition in 2018 and became World Champion in 2019.

Twan is also a National Record holder in the Powerlifting discipline Deadlift in the weight category until 85 kg.

After the World Championships in Papendal, the Netherlands on 22 August 2021, in which van Gendt fell, he announced that he would stop his BMX career. He wanted to focus on cross-country mountain biking for the next two years.

== See also ==
- List of Dutch Olympic cyclists
