= Cycling at the 2010 Summer Youth Olympics – Girls' cross country =

Girls' cross country was part of the cycling at the 2010 Summer Youth Olympics program. The event consisted of five 3.1 kilometres (1.9 mi) laps of cycling for a total of 15.5 kilometres (9.6 mi). Should an athlete become lapped during the race she would be forced to stop. It was held on 17 August 2010 at Tampines Bike Park. This was not an official individual event and therefore medals were not given. However the performance of the athletes provided points towards the Combined Mixed Team event for cycling.

== Results ==
The race began at approximately 9:00 a.m. (UTC+8) on 17 August at Tampines Bike Park.

Rank	Bib No.	Name	Final Time	Time Behind	Points	Penalty Points
1	CZE 1	Karolina Kalasova (CZE)	46:58	±0:00	1	
2	SUI 1	Linda Indergand (SUI)	47:06	+0:08	5	
3	CAN 1	Kristina Laforge (CAN)	49:22	+2:24	8	
4	ITA 1	Alessia Bulleri (ITA)	50:23	+3:25	12	
5	CHI 1	Laura Munizaga Holloway (CHI)	50:24	+3:26	15	
6	POL 1	Monika Zur (POL)	51:23	+4:25	18	
7	MEX 1	Íngrid Drexel (MEX)	51:55	+4:57	21	
8	THA 1	Siriluck Warapiang (THA)	52:40	+5:42	24	
9	CYP 1	Antri Christoforou (CYP)	54:11	+7:13	27	
10	POR 1	Magda Soraia Fernandes Martins (POR)	54:19	+7:21	30	
11	JPN 1	Manami Iwade (JPN)	54:19	+7:21	32	
12	LAT 1	Lija Laizāne (LAT)	55:05	+8:07	34	
13	INA 1	Elga Kharisma Novanda (INA)	55:25	+8:27	36	
14	NZL 1	Sarah Kate McDonald (NZL)	55:30	+8:32	37	
15	KAZ 1	Rimma Luchshenko (KAZ)	55:52	+8:54	38	
16	NED 1	Maartje Hereijgers (NED)	56:17	+9:19	39	
17	HUN 1	Zsofia Keri (HUN)	56:51	+9:53	40	
18	COL 1	Jessica Legarda (COL)	57:56	+10:58	40	
19	BEL 1	Tori van de Perre (BEL)	58:03	+11:05	40	
20	BLR 1	Volha Masiukovich (BLR)	58:29	+11:31	40	
21	ESP 1	Bianca Martin (ESP)	-1LAP		40	
22	SIN 1	Nur Nasthasia Abdul Nazzeer (SIN)	-2LAP		40	
23	RSA 1	Teagan O'Keeffe (RSA)	-2LAP		40	
24	ZIM 1	Shaylene Brown (ZIM)	-2LAP		40	
25	SLO 1	Nika Kozar (SLO)	-2LAP		40	
26	SRB 1	Jovana Crnogorac (SRB)	-2LAP		40	
27	DEN 1	Mette Jepsen (DEN)	-2LAP		40	
28	AUS 1	Kirsten Dellar (AUS)	-2LAP		40	
29	BRA 1	Mayara Perez (BRA)	-3LAP		40	
30	BOL 1	Jimena Montecinos (BOL)	-3LAP		40	
	ARG 1	Verena Brunner (ARG)	DNF4		40	10
	ERI 1	Senait Araya Debesay (ERI)	DNS		40	15
