= Cycling at the 2010 Summer Youth Olympics – Girls' time trial =

Girls' time trial was part of the cycling at the 2010 Summer Youth Olympics program. The event consisted of one lap of cycling at a length of 3.2 kilometres (2.0 mi). It was held on 22 August 2010 at The Float at Marina Bay. This was not an official individual event and therefore medals were not given. However the performance of the athletes provided points towards the Combined Mixed Team event for cycling.

== Results ==
The race began at approximately 9:00 a.m. (UTC+8) on 22 August at The Float at Marina Bay.

Rank	Bib No.	Name	Final Time	Time Behind	Points
1	SUI 1	Linda Indergand (SUI)	3:18.00	±0.00	1
2	CZE 1	Karolina Kalasova (CZE)	3:23.87	+5.87	5
3	MEX 1	Íngrid Drexel (MEX)	3:25.37	+7.37	8
4	NZL 1	Sarah Kate McDonald (NZL)	3:28.24	+10.24	12
5	CHI 1	Laura Munizaga Holloway (CHI)	3:30.12	+12.12	15
6	CYP 1	Antri Christoforou (CYP)	3:33.10	+15.10	18
7	ITA 1	Alessia Bulleri (ITA)	3:33.42	+15.42	21
8	KAZ 1	Rimma Luchshenko (KAZ)	3:35.05	+17.05	24
9	LAT 1	Lija Laizāne (LAT)	3:36.31	+18.31	27
10	NED 1	Maartje Hereijgers (NED)	3:36.37	+18.37	30
11	INA 1	Elga Kharisma Novanda (INA)	3:36.98	+18.98	32
12	BLR 1	Volha Masiukovich (BLR)	3:37.03	+19.03	34
13	ESP 1	Bianca Martin (ESP)	3:37.11	+19.11	36
14	ARG 1	Verena Brunner (ARG)	3:38.55	+20.55	37
15	AUS 1	Kirsten Dellar (AUS)	3:39.09	+21.09	38
16	SLO 1	Nika Kozar (SLO)	3:39.20	+21.20	39
17	COL 1	Jessica Legarda (COL)	3:40.80	+22.80	40
18	CAN 1	Kristina Laforge (CAN)	3:41.05	+23.05	40
19	RSA 1	Teagan O'Keeffe (RSA)	3:42.09	+24.09	40
20	JPN 1	Manami Iwade (JPN)	3:42.29	+24.29	40
21	POR 1	Magda Soraia Fernandes Martins (POR)	3:43.83	+25.83	40
22	THA 1	Siriluck Warapiang (THA)	3:44.10	+26.10	40
23	ERI 1	Senait Araya Debesay (ERI)	3:44.35	+26.35	40
24	HUN 1	Zsofia Keri (HUN)	3:46.03	+28.03	40
25	SIN 1	Nur Nasthasia Abdul Nazzeer (SIN)	3:51.74	+33.74	40
26	DEN 1	Mette Jepsen (DEN)	3:52.13	+34.13	40
27	BRA 1	Mayara Perez (BRA)	3:52.18	+34.18	40
28	BEL 1	Tori van de Perre (BEL)	3:53.78	+35.78	40
29	SRB 1	Jovana Crnogorac (SRB)	3:58.54	+40.54	40
30	ZIM 1	Shaylene Brown (ZIM)	4:02.44	+44.44	40
31	BOL 1	Jimena Montecinos (BOL)	4:17.34	+59.34	40
	POL 1	Monika Zur (POL)	DNS		40
