= Cycling at the 2010 Summer Youth Olympics – Girls' BMX =

Girls' BMX was part of the cycling at the 2010 Summer Youth Olympics program. The event consisted of a seeding round, then elimination rounds where after three races the top 4 would progress to the next round until the final where only a single race was held. It was held on 19 August 2010 at Tampines Bike Park. This was not an official individual event and therefore medals were not given. However the performance of the athletes provided points towards the Combined Mixed Team event for cycling.

== Seeding Round ==
The seeding round began at approximately 10:00 a.m. (UTC+8) on 19 August at Tampines Bike Park.

Rank	Bib No.	Name	Time	Gap
1	BRA 1	Mayara Perez (BRA)	36.593	±0.000
2	AUS 1	Kirsten Dellar (AUS)	36.757	+0.164
3	NED 1	Maartje Hereijgers (NED)	37.250	+0.657
4	RSA 1	Teagan O'Keeffe (RSA)	37.360	+0.767
5	DEN 1	Mette Jepsen (DEN)	37.905	+1.312
6	BEL 1	Tori van de Perre (BEL)	38.180	+1.587
7	INA 1	Elga Kharisma Novanda (INA)	41.454	+4.861
8	SUI 1	Linda Indergand (SUI)	42.196	+5.603
9	CHI 1	Laura Munizaga Holloway (CHI)	42.349	+5.756
10	JPN 1	Manami Iwade (JPN)	43.321	+6.728
11	NZL 1	Sarah Kate McDonald (NZL)	44.089	+7.496
12	SIN 1	Nur Nasthasia Abdul Nazzeer (SIN)	44.254	+7.661
13	MEX 1	Íngrid Drexel (MEX)	44.350	+7.757
14	THA 1	Siriluck Warapiang (THA)	44.891	+8.298
15	ITA 1	Alessia Bulleri (ITA)	45.185	+8.592
16	HUN 1	Zsofia Keri (HUN)	45.912	+9.319
17	POR 1	Magda Soraia Fernandes Martins (POR)	47.071	+10.478
18	ZIM 1	Shaylene Brown (ZIM)	47.169	+10.576
19	ARG 1	Verena Brunner (ARG)	48.200	+11.607
20	COL 1	Jessica Legarda (COL)	49.016	+12.423
21	LAT 1	Lija Laizāne (LAT)	49.611	+13.018
22	BOL 1	Jimena Montecinos (BOL)	51.130	+14.537
23	ESP 1	Bianca Martin (ESP)	52.434	+15.841
24	SRB 1	Jovana Crnogorac (SRB)	54.496	+17.903
25	SLO 1	Nika Kozar (SLO)	54.829	+18.236
26	BLR 1	Volha Masiukovich (BLR)	54.982	+18.389
27	CZE 1	Karolina Kalasova (CZE)	56.064	+19.471
28	CYP 1	Antri Christoforou (CYP)	56.479	+19.886
29	CAN 1	Kristina Laforge (CAN)	1:00.152	+23.559
30	KAZ 1	Rimma Luchshenko (KAZ)	1:00.525	+23.932
31	POL 1	Monika Zur (POL)	1:09.123	+32.530
	ERI 1	Senait Araya Debesay (ERI)	DNS	

== Quarterfinals ==
The quarterfinals began at approximately 1:30 p.m. (UTC+8) on 19 August at Tampines Bike Park.

=== Heat 1 ===
Rank	Bib No.	Name	1st run	2nd run	3rd run	Total	Notes
1	BRA 1	Mayara Perez (BRA)	1 (39.039)	1 (40.810)	1 (38.601)	3	Q
2	SUI 1	Linda Indergand (SUI)	3 (41.419)	2 (41.222)	2 (41.141)	7	Q
3	CHI 1	Laura Munizaga Holloway (CHI)	2 (41.232)	3 (41.231)	3 (41.273)	8	Q
4	HUN 1	Zsofia Keri (HUN)	4 (45.714)	4 (45.724)	4 (45.361)	12	Q
5	POR 1	Magda Soraia Fernandes Martins (POR)	5 (46.577)	5 (46.567)	5 (47.961)	15	
6	SRB 1	Jovana Crnogorac (SRB)	6 (51.416)	6 (50.843)	6 (50.268)	18	
7	SLO 1	Nika Kozar (SLO)	7 (54.173)	7 (52.031)	7 (52.993)	21	

=== Heat 2 ===
Rank	Bib No.	Name	1st run	2nd run	3rd run	Total	Notes
1	RSA 1	Teagan O'Keeffe (RSA)	1 (37.453)	1 (37.943)	1 (37.477)	3	Q
2	DEN 1	Mette Jepsen (DEN)	2 (37.550)	2 (38.057)	2 (38.129)	6	Q
3	SIN 1	Nur Nasthasia Abdul Nazzeer (SIN)	3 (43.065)	4 (42.957)	3 (42.560)	10	Q
4	CAN 1	Kristina Laforge (CAN)	5 (43.349)	3 (42.683)	4 (42.683)	12	Q
5	MEX 1	Íngrid Drexel (MEX)	4 (43.267)	5 (43.826)	6 (48.147)	15	
6	COL 1	Jessica Legarda (COL)	6 (49.470)	7 (49.182)	5 (48.139)	18	
7	LAT 1	Lija Laizāne (LAT)	7 (49.763)	6 (49.176)	7 (48.447)	20	
8	CYP 1	Antri Christoforou (CYP)	8 (53.777)	8 (53.878)	8 (54.308)	24	

=== Heat 3 ===
Rank	Bib No.	Name	1st run	2nd run	3rd run	Total	Notes
1	AUS 1	Kirsten Dellar (AUS)	1 (38.448)	1 (38.138)	1 (36.978)	3	Q
2	INA 1	Elga Kharisma Novanda (INA)	2 (41.054)	2 (40.971)	2 (40.235)	6	Q
3	JPN 1	Manami Iwade (JPN)	3 (43.573)	3 (42.648)	3 (42.540)	9	Q
4	ITA 1	Alessia Bulleri (ITA)	4 (44.350)	4 (44.802)	4 (44.705)	12	Q
5	ZIM 1	Shaylene Brown (ZIM)	5 (45.670)	5 (46.115)	5 (45.376)	15	
6	BLR 1	Volha Masiukovich (BLR)	6 (47.227)	6 (47.267)	6 (48.432)	18	
7	ESP 1	Bianca Martin (ESP)	7 (51.063)	7 (52.723)	7 (52.142)	21	
	POL 1	Monika Zur (POL)	10 (DNS)	10 (DNS)		DSQ	

=== Heat 4 ===
Rank	Bib No.	Name	1st run	2nd run	3rd run	Total	Notes
1	NED 1	Maartje Hereijgers (NED)	1 (37.925)	1 (38.056)	1 (38.146)	3	Q
2	BEL 1	Tori van de Perre (BEL)	2 (38.554)	2 (39.441)	2 (39.016)	6	Q
3	NZL 1	Sarah Kate McDonald (NZL)	3 (43.669)	3 (43.577)	3 (44.292)	9	Q
4	THA 1	Siriluck Warapiang (THA)	4 (44.327)	4 (44.061)	4 (45.651)	12	Q
5	ARG 1	Verena Brunner (ARG)	5 (45.417)	5 (45.708)	5 (46.739)	15	
6	KAZ 1	Rimma Luchshenko (KAZ)	7 (46.830)	6 (45.994)	6 (47.293)	19	
7	CZE 1	Karolina Kalasova (CZE)	6 (46.427)	8 (1:10.227)	7 (50.203)	21	
8	BOL 1	Jimena Montecinos (BOL)	8 (50.059)	7 (51.266)	8 (52.686)	23	

== Semifinals ==
The semifinals began at approximately 2:55 p.m. (UTC+8) on 19 August at Tampines Bike Park.

=== Heat 1 ===
Rank	Bib No.	Name	1st run	2nd run	3rd run	Total	Notes
1	BRA 1	Mayara Perez (BRA)	1 (36.818)	1 (37.270)	3 (38.800)	5	Q
2	RSA 1	Teagan O'Keeffe (RSA)	2 (38.019)	3 (39.182)	1 (38.039)	6	Q
3	DEN 1	Mette Jepsen (DEN)	3 (38.716)	2 (37.797)	2 (38.258)	7	Q
4	SUI 1	Linda Indergand (SUI)	4 (40.193)	4 (39.878)	4 (40.242)	12	Q
5	CHI 1	Laura Munizaga Holloway (CHI)	5 (41.518)	5 (41.086)	5 (40.514)	15	
6	SIN 1	Nur Nasthasia Abdul Nazzer (SIN)	6 (42.674)	6 (42.029)	6 (41.385)	18	
7	CAN 1	Kristina Laforge (CAN)	7 (42.989)	7 (42.880)	7 (43.267)	21	
8	HUN 1	Zsofia Keri (HUN)	8 (45.613)	8 (45.488)	8 (45.404)	24	

=== Heat 2 ===
Rank	Bib No.	Name	1st run	2nd run	3rd run	Total	Notes
1	NED 1	Maartje Hereijgers (NED)	2 (38.277)	1 (36.851)	1 (37.034)	4	Q
2	AUS 1	Kirsten Dellar (AUS)	1 (37.353)	2 (37.756)	2 (38.284)	5	Q
3	BEL 1	Tori van de Perre (BEL)	3 (39.197)	3 (39.144)	3 (39.727)	9	Q
4	INA 1	Elga Kharisma Novanda (INA)	4 (40.331)	4 (40.798)	4 (40.894)	12	Q
5	JPN 1	Manami Iwade (JPN)	6 (44.103)	5 (43.318)	6 (43.916)	17	
6	NZL 1	Sarah Kate McDonald (NZL)	5 (43.567)	6 (44.083)	7 (44.908)	18	
7	THA 1	Siriluck Warapiang (THA)	7 (45.088)	7 (44.557)	5 (43.874)	19	
8	ITA 1	Alessia Bulleri (ITA)	8 (45.993)	8 (45.501)	8 (46.191)	24	

== Finals ==
The finals began at approximately 4:10 p.m. (UTC+8) on 19 August at Tampines Bike Park.

Rank	Bib No.	Name	Time	Gap
1	BRA 1	Mayara Perez (BRA)	35.698	±0.000
2	AUS 1	Kirsten Dellar (AUS)	36.133	+0.435
3	NED 1	Maartje Hereijgers (NED)	36.457	+0.759
4	RSA 1	Teagan O'Keeffe (RSA)	36.982	+1.284
5	DEN 1	Mette Jepsen (DEN)	37.143	+1.445
6	BEL 1	Tori van de Perre (BEL)	38.060	+2.362
7	INA 1	Elga Kharisma Novanda (INA)	39.624	+3.926
8	SUI 1	Linda Indergand (SUI)	39.644	+3.946

== Points ==
Rank	Bib No.	Name	Points
1	BRA 1	Mayara Perez (BRA)	1
2	AUS 1	Kirsten Dellar (AUS)	5
3	NED 1	Maartje Hereijgers (NED)	8
4	RSA 1	Teagan O'Keeffe (RSA)	12
5	DEN 1	Mette Jepsen (DEN)	15
6	BEL 1	Tori van de Perre (BEL)	18
7	INA 1	Elga Kharisma Novanda (INA)	21
8	SUI 1	Linda Indergand (SUI)	24
9	CHI 1	Laura Minizaga Holloway (CHI)	27
10	JPN 1	Manami Iwade (JPN)	30
11	NZL 1	Sarah Kate McDonald (NZL)	32
12	SIN 1	Nur Nasthasia Abdul Nazzeer (SIN)	34
13	THA 1	Siriluck Christoforou (THA)	36
14	CAN 1	Kristina Laforge (CAN)	37
15	HUN 1	Zsofia Keri (HUN)	38
16	ITA 1	Alessia Bulleri (ITA)	39
17	MEX 1	Íngrid Drexel (MEX)	40
18	ZIM 1	Shaylene Brown (ZIM)	40
19	ARG 1	Verena Brunner (ARG)	40
20	POR 1	Magda Soraia Fernandes Martins (POR)	40
21	BLR 1	Volha Masiukovich (BLR)	40
22	COL 1	Jessica Legarda (COL)	40
23	SRB 1	Jovana Crnogorac (SRB)	40
24	KAZ 1	Rimma Luchshenko (KAZ)	40
25	LAT 1	Lija Laizāne (LAT)	40
26	ESP 1	Bianca Martin (ESP)	40
27	SLO 1	Nika Kozar (SLO)	40
28	CZE 1	Karolina Kalasova (CZE)	40
29	BOL 1	Jimena Montecinos (BOL)	40
30	CYP 1	Antri Christoforou (CYP)	40
31	POL 1	Monika Zur (POL)	40
32	ERI 1	Senait Araya Debesay (ERI)	40
