= 2010 in Bolivian football =

Football in Bolivia
- Season: 2010

The 2010 season of Bolivian football was the 99th season of competitive football in Bolivia.

== National leagues ==
=== Torneo Apertura ===
Pos	Team	Pld	W	D	L	GF	GA	GD	Pts	Qualification
1	Jorge Wilstermann	10	6	2	2	15	11	+4	20	2011 Copa Libertadores Second Stage
2	Oriente Petrolero	10	6	1	3	18	11	+7	19	
3	Aurora	10	4	2	4	19	18	+1	14	
4	The Strongest	10	3	4	3	15	14	+1	13	2011 Copa Sudamericana First Stage (Note: The Strongest qualified for the 2011 Copa Sudamericana, as Oriente Petrolero later qualified for the 2011 Copa Libertadores and Aurora also later qualified for the 2011 Copa Sudamericana through the Clausura.)
5	Bolívar	10	3	2	5	7	14	−7	11	
6	San José	10	1	3	6	13	24	−11	6	

Source: Soccer Way
Rules for classification: 1) points; 2) goal difference; 3) number of goals scored.

=== Torneo Clausura ===
Pos	Team	Pld	W	D	L	GF	GA	GD	Pts	Qualification
1	Oriente Petrolero	22	12	4	6	38	26	+12	40	2011 Copa Libertadores Second Stage
2	Bolívar	22	10	6	6	37	28	+9	36	2011 Copa Libertadores First Stage
3	Aurora	22	10	4	8	34	30	+4	34	2011 Copa Sudamericana Second Stage (Note: Aurora was given the Second Stage spot in the 2011 Copa Sudamericana by the decision of the Bolivian Football Federation.)
4	San José	22	10	4	8	39	37	+2	34	
5	Guabirá	22	9	5	8	22	28	−6	32	
6	Blooming	22	9	4	9	28	26	+2	31	
7	Real Potosí	22	8	5	9	38	35	+3	29	
8	The Strongest	22	10	2	10	37	36	+1	29 (Note: 3 points deducted)	2011 Copa Sudamericana First Stage (Note: The Strongest qualified to Copa Sudamericana as the best 2010 aggregate table among non-champions.)
9	Real Mamoré	22	7	7	8	21	30	−9	28	
10	La Paz	22	7	5	10	33	36	−3	26	
11	Jorge Wilstermann	22	5	7	10	26	32	−6	22	
12	Universitario de Sucre	22	5	7	10	24	33	−9	22	

Rules for classification: 1) points; 2) goal difference; 3) number of goals scored.

=== Relegation ===
Pos	Team	2009 Pts	2010 Pts	Total Pts	Total Pld	Avg	Relegation
1	Bolívar	65	64	129	68	1.897	
2	Oriente Petrolero	54	62	116	68	1.706	
3	Real Potosí	61	45	106	68	1.559	
4	San José	50	52	102	68	1.5	
5	The Strongest	53	48	101	68	1.485	
6	Universitario	51	38	89	68	1.309	
7	Guabirá	0	44	44	34	1.294	
8	Aurora	37	51	88	68	1.294	
9	Blooming	45	42	87	68	1.279	
10	La Paz	42	40	82	68	1.206	
11	Real Mamoré	33	40	73	68	1.074	Relegation Playoff Match
12	Jorge Wilstermann	32	40	72	68	1.059	Relegation to the Primera A

=== Copa Simon Bolivar ===
The 2010 Copa Simon Bolivar started on August 6, 2010, and concluded on November 21, 2010. The Copa Simon Bolivar final was played between Real America and Nacional Potosi.

November 14, 2010

Nacional Potosi	2–0	Real America
	Report

Estadio Victor Agustín Ugarte

November 21, 2010

Real America	0–1	Nacional Potosi
	Report

Estadio Ramón Tahuichi Aguilera

== State Championship Champions Primera A ==
State	Champion
Santa Cruz	Real America
La Paz	Mariscal Braun
Cochabamba	Enrique Happ
Tarija	Ciclón
Oruro	31 de Octubre
Potosi	Nacional Potosi
Beni	Primero de Mayo
Pando	Real Vaca Díez
Chuquisaca	Independiente Petrolero

== Bolivian clubs in international competitions ==
Team	2010 Copa Libertadores	2010 Copa Sudamericana	2010 FIFA Club World Cup
Blooming	Eliminated in the Second Stage	N/A	N/A
Bolívar	Eliminated in the Second Stage	N/A	N/A
Universitario	N/A	Eliminated in the Round of 16	N/A
Oriente Petrolero	N/A	Eliminated in the Second Stage	N/A
Real Potosí	Eliminated in the First Stage	N/A	N/A
San José	N/A	Eliminated in the Round of 16	N/A

== Bolivia national team ==
The following table lists all the games played by the Bolivian national team in official competitions and friendly matches during 2010.

February 25, 2010 International; Friendly	Mexico	5–0	Bolivia	San Francisco
21:30 (UTC+1)	Pablo Barrera 3'; Javier Hernández 13', 20'; Braulio Luna 18'; Paul Aguilar 51'	Report		Stadium: Candlestick Park; Attendance: 20,000; Referee: Terry Vaughn (United States)

August 12, 2010 International; Friendly	Bolivia	1–1	Colombia	La Paz
18:00 (UTC-4:30)	Roberto Galindo 64'	Report	Carlos Bacca 37'	Stadium: Estadio Hernando Siles; Attendance: 4,000; Referee: Gabriel Favale (Argentina)

October 8, 2010 International; Friendly	Bolivia	1–3	Venezuela	Santa Cruz de la Sierra
19:00 (UTC-4:30)	Marcelo Moreno 52'	Report	Ángel Chourio 10', 37'; Oswaldo Vizcarrondo 28'	Stadium: Estadio Ramón Tahuichi Aguilera; Referee: Ibrahim Chaibou (Niger)

=== Bolivia U-15 ===
August 13, 2010 Youth Olympics	Vanuatu	0–2	Bolivia	Singapore
18:00 (UTC+1)		Report	Carlos Añez 19'; Luis Banegas 42'	Stadium: Jalan Besar Stadium; Attendance: 2,479; Referee: István Vad (Hungary)

August 16, 2010 Youth Olympics	Bolivia	9–0	Haiti	Singapore
		Report	Cristian Arano 23'; Roberto Mejido 37', 43', 68', 81'; Romero Vaca 42'; Gutrhie 42'; Manzur 49'; Alpire 70'	Stadium: Jalan Besar Stadium; Attendance: 1,215; Referee: Norbert Hauata (Tahiti)

August 22, 2010 Youth Olympics	Bolivia	3–1	Montenegro	Singapore
	Sabja 5'; Mejido 56'; Banegas 60'	Report	Boljević 26'	Stadium: Jalan Besar Stadium; Attendance: 3,500; Referee: Banjar Al-Dosari (Qatar)

August 25, 2010 Youth Olympics	Bolivia	5–0	Haiti	Singapore
	Mejido 5'; Alpire 31'; Arano 53'; Banegas 60', 72'	Report		Stadium: Jalan Besar Stadium; Attendance: 5,230; Referee: István Vad (Hungary)

=== Bolivia U-20 ===
November 14, 2010 Copa Aerosur; Internacional Sub-20	Bolivia	2–2	Colombia	Santa Cruz de la Sierra
	Alejandro Chumacero 28'; Reyes Antelo 90'	Report	Edwin Cardona 5', 23'	Stadium: Estadio Ramón Tahuichi Aguilera; Attendance: 2,000; Referee: Paulin Samuel Ilboudo Serge (Burkina Faso)

November 18, 2010 Copa Aerosur; Internacional Sub-20	Bolivia	3–1	Uruguay	Santa Cruz de la Sierra
	Alejandro Chumacero 35'; Ramiro Ballivián 51'; Darwin Ríos 76'	Report	Sebastian Gallegos 30'	Stadium: Estadio Ramón Tahuichi Aguilera; Attendance: 1,500; Referee: Csak Janos (Hungary)

November 20, 2010 Copa Aerosur; Internacional Sub-20	Bolivia	2–3	Argentina	Santa Cruz de la Sierra
	Alejandro Chumacero 35'; Ramiro Ballivián 51'; Darwin Ríos 76'	Report	Juan Manuel Iturbe 19', 82'; Leandro Díaz 60'	Stadium: Estadio Ramón Tahuichi Aguilera; Attendance: 1,000; Referee: Csak Janos (Hungary)

November 22, 2010 Copa Aerosur; Internacional Sub-20	Bolivia	1–2	Paraguay	Santa Cruz de la Sierra
	Rodrigo Borda 13'	Report	Ivan Vargas 19', 90'	Stadium: Estadio Ramón Tahuichi Aguilera; Referee: Paulin Samuel Ilboudo Serge (Burkina Faso)
