= Costa Rica at the 2010 Summer Youth Olympics =

- IOC code: CRC
- NOC: Comité Olímpico de Costa Rica

in Singapore
- Competitors: 5 in 5 sports
- Flag bearer: Gerald Drummond
- Medals: Gold 0 Silver 0 Bronze 0 Total 0

Summer Youth Olympics appearances
- 2010; 2014; 2018; 2026

Costa Rica participated in the 2010 Summer Youth Olympics in Singapore.

The Costa Rican squad consisted of 5 athletes competing in 5 sports: aquatics (swimming), athletics, fencing, judo and triathlon.

== Medalists ==
| Medal | Name | Sport | Event | Date |
|---|---|---|---|---|
| Bronze | Andrea Guillen | Judo | Mixed Event | 25 Aug |

== Athletics ==
=== Boys ===
Track and Road Events

| Athletes | Event | Qualification | | Final | |
| Athletes | Event | Result | Rank | Result | Rank |
|---|---|---|---|---|---|
| Gerald Drummond | Boys’ 400m hurdles | 54.51 | 13 qB | 54.83 | 11 |

== Fencing ==
Group Stage

| Athlete | Event | Match 1 | Match 2 | Match 3 | Match 4 | Match 5 | Match 6 | Seed |
|---|---|---|---|---|---|---|---|---|
| Julian Godoy | Boys’ Épée | Lyssov (CAN); L 2-5 | Lim (SIN); W 5-3 | Bodoczi (GER); L 0-5 | Ciovica (ROU); L 2-5 | Novotny (CZE); L 4-5 | Na (KOR); L 1-5 | 13 |

Knock-Out Stage

| Athlete | Event | Round of 16 | Quarterfinals | Semifinals | Final | Rank |
|---|---|---|---|---|---|---|
| Julian Godoy | Boys’ Épée | Lyssov (CAN); L 3-15 | did not advance | | | 13 |

== Judo ==
Individual

| Athlete | Event | Round 1 | Round 2 | Round 3 | Semifinals | Final | Rank |
| Athlete | Event | Opposition Result | Opposition Result | Opposition Result | Opposition Result | Opposition Result | Rank |
|---|---|---|---|---|---|---|---|
| Andrea Guillen | Girls' -63 kg | BYE | Shor (ISR); L 000-110 | Repechage; Rak (EST); L 001-002 | did not advance | | 13 |

Team

| Team | Event | Round 1 | Round 2 | Semifinals | Final | Rank |
| Team | Event | Opposition Result | Opposition Result | Opposition Result | Opposition Result | Rank |
|---|---|---|---|---|---|---|
| Cairo; Neha Thakur (IND); Mansurkhuja Muminkhujaev (UZB); Christine Huck (AUT); Ioan Visan (ROU); Andrea Guillen (CRC); Eldin Omerovic (BIH); Barbara Matić (CRO); Pedro Pineda (VEN) | Mixed Team | Birmingham; W 5-2 | Hamilton; W 4-4 (3-2) | Essen; L 2-5 | Did not advance | Bronze medal |

== Swimming ==
| Athletes | Event | Heat | | Semifinal | | Final | |
| Athletes | Event | Time | Position | Time | Position | Time | Position |
|---|---|---|---|---|---|---|---|
| Dayana Castro | Girls' 50m Freestyle | 28.60 | 39 | Did not advance | | | |
| Dayana Castro | Girls' 100m Freestyle | 1:01.65 | 45 | Did not advance | | | |

== Triathlon ==
Men's

| Athlete | Event | Swim (1.5 km) | Trans 1 | Bike (40 km) | Trans 2 | Run (10 km) | Total | Rank |
|---|---|---|---|---|---|---|---|---|
| Gabriel Zumbado Vargas | Individual | 9:30 | 0:32 | 30:23 | 0:24 | 19:30 | 1:00:19.17 | 28 |

Mixed

| Athlete | Event | Total Times per Athlete (Swim 250 m, Bike 7 km, Run 1.7 km) | Total Group Time | Rank |
|---|---|---|---|---|
| Andrea Arenas (VEN); Gabriel Zumbado (CRC); Viviana González (COL); Andres Diaz (COL) | Mixed Team Relay; Americas 4 | 23:17; 20:44; 23:30; 20:21 | 1:27:52.84 | 14 |
