= Serbia at the 2010 Summer Youth Olympics =

- IOC code: SRB
- NOC: Olympic Committee of Serbia
- Website: www.oks.org.rs

in Singapore
- Competitors: 32 in 8 sports
- Flag bearer: Velimir Stjepanović
- Medals Ranked 42nd: Gold 1 Silver 1 Bronze 1 Total 3

Summer Youth Olympics appearances
- 2010; 2014; 2018

Serbia participated in the 2010 Summer Youth Olympics in Singapore.

== Medalists ==
Medal	Name	Sport	Event	Date
Gold	Saša Avramović; Marko Radonjić; Nemanja Bezbradica; Stefan Popovski-Turanjanin	Basketball	Boys' Final	23 Aug
Silver	Velimir Stjepanović	Swimming	Boys' 100m freestyle	20 Aug
Bronze	Velimir Stjepanović	Swimming	Boys' 100m butterfly	16 Aug

- Olympic Committee of Serbia has declared medalists for the best young athletes in 2010. Stjepanović received the award for best young athlete and basketball players for the best youth team.

== Athletics ==
=== Girls ===
Track and Road Events

Athletes	Event	Qualification		Final	
Athletes	Event	Result	Rank	Result	Rank
Katarina Ilić	Girls' 400m	56.41	12 qB	55.77	10

Field Events

Athletes	Event	Qualification		Final	
Athletes	Event	Result	Rank	Result	Rank
Sandra Raičković	Girls' Triple Jump	12.30	7 Q	NM	

== Basketball ==
Boys

Squad List	Event	Group Stage		Placement Stage			Rank
Squad List	Event	Group A	Rank	1st-8th	1st-4th	1st-2nd	Rank
Stefan Popovski-Turanjanin; Saša Avramović; Marko Radonjić; Nemanja Bezbradica (C)	Boys' Basketball	India; W 33-19	1	Lithuania; W 33-22	United States; W 34-29	Croatia; W 22-9	Gold medal
Stefan Popovski-Turanjanin; Saša Avramović; Marko Radonjić; Nemanja Bezbradica (C)	Boys' Basketball	Greece; W 34-14	1	Lithuania; W 33-22	United States; W 34-29	Croatia; W 22-9	Gold medal
Stefan Popovski-Turanjanin; Saša Avramović; Marko Radonjić; Nemanja Bezbradica (C)	Boys' Basketball	New Zealand; W 30-13	1	Lithuania; W 33-22	United States; W 34-29	Croatia; W 22-9	Gold medal
Stefan Popovski-Turanjanin; Saša Avramović; Marko Radonjić; Nemanja Bezbradica (C)	Boys' Basketball	Puerto Rico; W 31-30	1	Lithuania; W 33-22	United States; W 34-29	Croatia; W 22-9	Gold medal

== Cycling ==
Cross Country

Athlete	Event	Time	Rank	Points
Lazar Jovanović	Boys' Cross Country	-2LAP	25	72
Jovana Crnogorac	Girls' Cross Country	-2LAP	26	40

Time Trial

Athlete	Event	Time	Rank	Points
Filip Pavlović	Boys' Time Trial	4:38.74	30	30
Jovana Crnogorac	Girls' Time Trial	3:58.54	29	40

BMX

Athlete	Event	Seeding Round		Quarterfinals							Semifinals							Final		
Athlete	Event	Seeding Round		Run 1		Run 2		Run 3		Rank	Run 1		Run 2		Run 3		Rank	Final		
Athlete	Event	Time	Rank	Time	Rank	Time	Rank	Time	Rank	Rank	Time	Rank	Time	Rank	Time	Rank	Rank	Time	Rank	Points
Aleksa Veličković	Boys' BMX	49.608	28	49.799	6	49.413	7	50.841	7	7	Did not advance									72
Jovana Crnogorac	Girls' BMX	54.496	24	51.416	6	50.843	6	50.268	6	6	Did not advance									40

Road Race

Athlete	Event	Time	Rank	Points
Filip Pavlović	Boys' Road Race	1:05:44	14	61*
Aleksa Veličković	Boys' Road Race	1:05:44	40	
Lazar Jovanović	Boys' Road Race	1:16:48	63	

Overall

Team	Event	Cross country Pts		Time Trial Pts		BMX Pts		Road Race Pts	Total	Rank
Team	Event	Boys	Girls	Boys	Girls	Boys	Girls	Road Race Pts	Total	Rank
Jovana Crnogorac; Lazar Jovanović; Filip Pavlović; Aleksa Veličković	Mixed Team	72	40	30	40	72	40	61*	355	27

- * Received -5 for finishing road race with all three racers

== Judo ==
Individual

Athlete	Event	Round 1	Round 2	Round 3	Semifinals	Final	Rank
Athlete	Event	Opposition Result	Opposition Result	Opposition Result	Opposition Result	Opposition Result	Rank
Mateja Glušac	Boys' -100 kg	Mamistvalov (ISR); L 000-100	Repechage; Pineda (VEN); W 100-000		Repechage; Mamistvalov (ISR); W 100-000	Bronze Medal Match; Piepke (GER); L 000-000*	5
Una Svetlana Tuba	Girls' -78 kg	Mansour (BEL); L 000-001	Repechage; Khelifi (ALG); W 100-000		Repechage; Savic (BIH); W 100-000	Bronze Medal Match; Darchuk (UKR); L 001-100	5

Team

Team	Event	Round 1	Round 2	Semifinals	Final	Rank
Team	Event	Opposition Result	Opposition Result	Opposition Result	Opposition Result	Rank
New York; Katelyn Bouyssou (USA); Dmytro Atanov (UKR); Julanda Bacaj (ALB); Matheus Marcia Machado (BRA); Dilara Incedayi (TUR); Ghenadie Pretivatii (MDA); Milica Savic (BIH); Mateja Glušac (SRB)	Mixed Team	BYE	Tokyo; L 4-4 (2-3)	Did not advance		5
Hamilton; Cynthia Rahming (BAH); Paolo Persoglia (SMR); Odette Giuffrida (ITA); Davit Ghazaryan (ARM); Wildjie Vertus (HAI); Jae Hyung Lee (KOR); Una Svetlana Tuba (SRB); Anis Shalabi (LBA)	Mixed Team	BYE	Cairo; L 4-4 (2-3)	Did not advance		5

== Rowing ==
Athlete	Event	Heats		Repechage		Semifinals		Final		Overall Rank
Athlete	Event	Time	Rank	Time	Rank	Time	Rank	Time	Rank	Overall Rank
Nikola Simović; Vuk Matović	Boys' Pair	3:10.54	3 QA/B			3:19.82	3 QA	3:10.94	5	5
Jovana Arsić	Girls' Single Sculls	4:04.97	5 QR	4:07.89	3 QC/D	4:13.45	1 QC	4:11.26	2	13

== Swimming ==
Athletes	Event	Heat		Semifinal		Final	
Athletes	Event	Time	Position	Time	Position	Time	Position
Velimir Stjepanović	Boys' 100m Freestyle	51.16	4 Q	50.56	4 Q	50.25	Silver medal
Velimir Stjepanović	Boys' 100m Butterfly	54.71	6 Q	54.00	3 Q	53.77	Bronze medal
Velimir Stjepanović	Boys' 200m Butterfly	2:02.04	5 Q			2:03.27	8
Stefan Šorak	Boys' 200m Freestyle	1:54.37	21			Did not advance	
Stefan Šorak	Boys' 400m Freestyle	4:03.37	13			Did not advance	
Katarina Simonović	Girls' 50m Freestyle	27.23	22	Did not advance			
Katarina Simonović	Girls' 200m Freestyle	2:06.13	19			Did not advance	
Katarina Simonović	Girls' 100m Butterfly	1:05.49	25	Did not advance			
Marija Joksimović	Girls' 400m Freestyle	4:32.25	19			Did not advance	
Velimir Stjepanović; Marija Joksimović; Katarina Simonović; Stefan Šorak	Mixed 4 × 100 m Freestyle Relay	3:41.15	10			Did not advance	
Velimir Stjepanović; Marija Joksimovic; Katarina Simonovic; Stefan Sorak	Mixed 4 × 100 m Medley Relay	4:41.02	16			Did not advance	

== Tennis ==
Singles

Athlete	Event	Round 1	Round 2	Quarterfinals	Semifinals	Final	Rank
Doroteja Erić	Girls' Singles	Jabeur (TUN); L 0-2 (6-7, 3-6)	Consolation; Friedsam (GER); L 0-2 (wd)	Did not advance			

Doubles

Athlete	Event	Round 1	Quarterfinals	Semifinals	Final	Rank
Doroteja Erić (SRB); Anna-Lena Friedsam (GER)	Girls' Doubles	Tang (CHN); Zheng (CHN); L 1-2 (5-7, 6-2, [11-13])	Did not advance			

== Volleyball ==
Squad List	Event	Group Stage		Semifinal	Bronze Medal Match	Rank
Squad List	Event	Group A	Rank	Semifinal	Bronze Medal Match	Rank
Stefan Vladisavljev; Boris Martinović; Nikola Živanović; Aleksandar Filipović; Aleksa Brđović; Ivan Glavinić; Sinisa Žarković (C); Filip Stoilović; Dimitrije Pantić; Čedomir Stanković; Rasko Jovanović; Milan Katić	Boys' Volleyball	DR Congo; W 3–1 (25-15, 25-18, 22-25, 25-21)	2 Q	Cuba; L 0–3 (22-25, 19-25, 22-25)	Russia; L 0–3 (17-25, 17-25, 15-25)	4
Stefan Vladisavljev; Boris Martinović; Nikola Živanović; Aleksandar Filipović; Aleksa Brđović; Ivan Glavinić; Sinisa Žarković (C); Filip Stoilović; Dimitrije Pantić; Čedomir Stanković; Rasko Jovanović; Milan Katić	Boys' Volleyball	Russia; L 0–3 (17-25, 20-25, 12-25)	2 Q	Cuba; L 0–3 (22-25, 19-25, 22-25)	Russia; L 0–3 (17-25, 17-25, 15-25)	4
