= Estonia at the 2010 Summer Youth Olympics =

- IOC code: EST
- NOC: Estonian Olympic Committee
- Website: www.eok.ee

in Singapore
- Competitors: 8 (4 boys, 4 girls) in 5 sports
- Flag bearer: Pjotr Degtjarjov
- Medals: Gold 0 Silver 0 Bronze 0 Total 0

Summer Youth Olympics appearances (overview)
- 2010; 2014; 2018

Estonia participated in the 2010 Summer Youth Olympics in Singapore.

== Competitors ==
The following is the list of number of competitors that participated at the Games per sport.

Sport	Boys	Girls	Total
Athletics	1	1	2
Judo	0	1	1
Rowing	0	1	1
Sailing	1	0	1
Swimming	2	1	3
Total	4	4	8

== Athletics ==
=== Boys ===
Field Events

Athletes	Event	Qualification		Final	
Athletes	Event	Result	Rank	Result	Rank
Joosep Piho	Boys’ Javelin Throw	66.70	12 qB	57.31	15

=== Girls ===
Field Events

Athletes	Event	Qualification		Final	
Athletes	Event	Result	Rank	Result	Rank
Kaia Soosaar	Girls’ Long Jump	6.04	2 Q	6.14	4

== Judo ==
Individual

Athlete	Event	Round 1	Round 2	Round 3	Semifinals	Final	Rank
Athlete	Event	Opposition Result	Opposition Result	Opposition Result	Opposition Result	Opposition Result	Rank
Natalia Rak	Girls' -63 kg	BYE	Tashiro (JPN); L 000-100	Repechage; Guillen (CRC); W 002-001	Repechage; Incedayi (TUR); L 000-100	Did not advance	9

Team

Team	Event	Round 1	Round 2	Semifinals	Final	Rank
Team	Event	Opposition Result	Opposition Result	Opposition Result	Opposition Result	Rank
Barcelona; Julia Rosso-Richetto (FRA); Subash Yadev (IND); Yu-Chun Wu (TPE); Maxamillian Schneider (USA); Natalia Rak (EST); Michael Greiter (AUT); Gulnoza Matniyazova (UZB); Bolot Toktogonov (KGZ)	Mixed Team	Osaka; L 3-5	did not advance			9

== Rowing ==
Athlete	Event	Heats		Repechage		Semifinals		Final		Overall Rank
Athlete	Event	Time	Rank	Time	Rank	Time	Rank	Time	Rank	Overall Rank
Eglit Võsu	Girls' Single Sculls	4:01.25	5 QR	4:04.16	4 QC/D	4:13.50	2 QC	4:11.47	3	14

== Sailing ==
Windsurfing

Athlete	Event	Race											Points	Rank
Athlete	Event	1	2	3	4	5	6	7	8	9	10	M*	Points	Rank
Nikita Rom	Boys' Techno 293	14	17	~~18~~	17	17	18	15	17	13	11	13	152	15

== Swimming ==
Athletes	Event	Heat		Semifinal		Final	
Athletes	Event	Time	Position	Time	Position	Time	Position
Pjotr Degtjarjov	Boys’ 50m Freestyle	23.53	8 Q	23.37	9	Did not advance	
Pjotr Degtjarjov	Boys’ 100m Freestyle	51.85	15 Q	52.67	16	Did not advance	
Timo Vaimann	Boys’ 50m Breaststroke	30.37	11 Q	30.75	11	Did not advance	
Timo Vaimann	Boys’ 100m Breaststroke	1:06.73	22	Did not advance			
Katriin Kersa	Girls’ 50m Freestyle	27.20	20	Did not advance			
Katriin Kersa	Girls’ 100m Freestyle	1:01.13	41	Did not advance			
