= Judo at the 2010 Summer Youth Olympics – Girls' 63 kg =

Judo competition

The Girls' 63 kg tournament in Judo at the 2010 Summer Youth Olympics was held on August 22, 2010, at the International Convention Centre.

This event was the second heaviest of the girl's judo weight classes, limiting competitors to a maximum of 63 kilograms of body mass. The tournament bracket consisted of a single-elimination contest culminating in a gold medal match. There was also a repechage to determine the winners of the two bronze medals. Each judoka who had lost before the finals competed in the repechage with the two finalists getting bronze medals.

== Medalists ==
Gold	Miku Tashiro; Japan
Silver	Flavia Gomes; Brazil
Bronze	Barbara Matic; Croatia
Bronze	Laura Naginskaite; Lithuania

== Results ==
=== Main Bracket ===
Round of 32
Neo Kapeko (BOT)	100
Djamila Tchaniley-Larounga (TOG)	000
Gaelle Nemorin (MRI)	000
Rotem Shor (ISR)	020

Round of 16
Sophina Arrey (CMR)	000
Sophio Beridze (GEO)	100
Neo Kapeko (BOT)	000
Flavia Gomes (BRA)	110
Caren Chammas (LIB)	000
Gulnoza Matniyazova (UZB)	101
Laura Naginskaite (LTU)	102
Haley Baxter (NZL)	000
Natalia Rak (EST)	000
Miku Tashiro (JPN)	100
Andrea Guillen (CRC)	000
Rotem Shor (ISR)	110
Julanda Bacaj (ALB)	000
Dilara Incedayi (TUR)	101
Wildjie Vertus (HAI)	000
Barbara Matic (CRO)	101

Quarterfinals
Sophio Beridze (GEO)	000
Flavia Gomes (BRA)	112
Gulnoza Matniyazova (UZB)	000
Laura Naginskaite (LTU)	110
Miku Tashiro (JPN)	101
Rotem Shor (ISR)	000
Dilara Incedayi (TUR)	000
Barbara Matic (CRO)	010

Semifinals
Flavia Gomes (BRA)	002
Laura Naginskaite (LTU)	000
Miku Tashiro (JPN)	100
Barbara Matic (CRO)	000

Finals
Flavia Gomes (BRA)	000
Miku Tashiro (JPN)	100

=== Repechage ===
Round 1
1	Djamila Tchaniley-Larounga (TOG)	000
2	Haley Baxter (NZL)	100

Round 1
1	Gaelle Nemorin (MRI)	010
2	Wildjie Vertus (HAI)	001

Round 2
Sophina Arrey (CMR)	100
Neo Kapeko (BOT)	000
Caren Chammas (LIB)	100
Haley Baxter (NZL)	000
Natalia Rak (EST)	002
Andrea Guillen (CRC)	001
Julanda Bacaj (ALB)	000
Gaelle Nemorin (MRI)	101

Second round
Sophina Arrey (CMR)	000
Gulnoza Matniyazova (UZB)	110
Caren Chammas (LIB)	100
Sophio Beridze (GEO)	000
Natalia Rak (EST)	000
Dilara Incedayi (TUR)	100
Gaelle Nemorin (MRI)	000
Rotem Shor (ISR)	100

Third round
Gulnoza Matniyazova (UZB)	001
Caren Chammas (LIB)	000
Dilara Incedayi (TUR)	000
Rotem Shor (ISR)	101

Bronze Medal Finals
Gulnoza Matniyazova (UZB)	000
Barbara Matic (CRO)	001
Rotem Shor (ISR)	000
Laura Naginskaite (LTU)	100
