= Bolivia at the 2010 Summer Youth Olympics =

- IOC code: BOL
- NOC: Bolivian Olympic Committee
- Website: https://www.comiteolimpicoboliviano.org.bo/

in Singapore 14 – 26 August 2010
- Competitors: 25 in 4 sports
- Flag bearer: Bruno Rojas
- Medals Ranked 50th: Gold 1 Silver 0 Bronze 0 Total 1

Summer Youth Olympics appearances
- 2010; 2014; 2018; 2026

Bolivia competed at the 2010 Summer Youth Olympics, the inaugural Youth Olympic Games, held in Singapore from 14 August to 26 August 2010.

== Medalists ==
Medal	Name	Sport	Event	Date
Gold	Bolivian Boys' Football team: Jorge Alpire; Macallister Amutary; Carlos Anez; Cristian Arano; Luis Banegas; Jhamil Bejarano; Osvaldo Daza; Pedro Galindo; Josue Gutrhie; Yasser Manzur; Marvin Martinez; Rodrigo Mejido; Alvaro Paz; Noel Rodriguez; Jorge Sabja; Gustavo Torrez; Romero Vaca; Harry Zegarra	Football	Boys' tournament	25 Aug

== Athletics ==
=== Boys ===
Track and road events

Athletes	Event	Qualification		Final	
Athletes	Event	Result	Rank	Result	Rank
Bruno Rojas	Boys' 100m	11.14	15 qB	10.90	13

== Cycling ==
Cross Country

Athlete	Event	Time	Rank	Points
Carlos Montellano	Boys’ Cross Country	-5LAP	31	72
Jimena Montecinos	Girls’ Cross Country	-3LAP	30	40

Time Trial

Athlete	Event	Time	Rank	Points
Samuel Melgar	Boys’ Time Trial	4:59.94	32	30
Jimena Montecinos	Girls’ Time Trial	4:17.34	31	40

BMX

Athlete	Event	Seeding Round		Quarterfinals							Semifinals							Final		
Athlete	Event	Seeding Round		Run 1		Run 2		Run 3		Rank	Run 1		Run 2		Run 3		Rank	Final		
Athlete	Event	Time	Rank	Time	Rank	Time	Rank	Time	Rank	Rank	Time	Rank	Time	Rank	Time	Rank	Rank	Time	Rank	Points
Sebastian Vargas	Boys’ BMX	33.282	13	33.690	4	33.801	4	39.814	5	4 Q	34.946	7	45.785	5	34.012	7	8	Did not advance		68
Jimena Montecinos	Girls’ BMX	51.130	22	50.059	8	51.266	7	52.686	8	8	Did not advance									40

Road Race

Athlete	Event	Time	Rank	Points
Carlos Montellano	Boys’ Road Race	1:14:08	58	67*
Samuel Melgar	Boys’ Road Race	1:16:48	65	
Sebastian Vargas	Boys’ Road Race	1:16:48	68	

Overall

Team	Event	Cross Country Pts		Time Trial Pts		BMX Pts		Road Race Pts	Total	Rank
Team	Event	Boys	Girls	Boys	Girls	Boys	Girls	Road Race Pts	Total	Rank
Jimena Montecinos; Carlos Montellano; Samuel Melgar; Sebastian Vargas	Mixed Team	72	40	30	40	68	40	67*	357	28

- * Received -5 for finishing road race with all three racers

== Football ==
Squad list	Event	Group stage		Semifinal	Final	Rank
Squad list	Event	Group C	Rank	Semifinal	Final	Rank
Pedro Galindo (C); Alvaro Paz; Carlos Anez; Macallister Amutary; Noel Rodriguez; Romero Vaca; Jhamil Bejarano; Yasser Manzur; Jorge Alpire; Jorge Sabja; Rodrigo Mejido; Harry Zegarra; Osvaldo Daza; Marvin Martinez; Cristian Arano; Gustavo Torrez; Luis Banegas; Josue Gutrhie	Boys' Football	Vanuatu; W 2-0	1 Q	Montenegro; W 3-1	Haiti; W 5-0	Gold medal
Pedro Galindo (C); Alvaro Paz; Carlos Anez; Macallister Amutary; Noel Rodriguez; Romero Vaca; Jhamil Bejarano; Yasser Manzur; Jorge Alpire; Jorge Sabja; Rodrigo Mejido; Harry Zegarra; Osvaldo Daza; Marvin Martinez; Cristian Arano; Gustavo Torrez; Luis Banegas; Josue Gutrhie	Boys' Football	Haiti; W 9-0	1 Q	Montenegro; W 3-1	Haiti; W 5-0	Gold medal

== Swimming ==
Athletes	Event	Heat		Semifinal		Final	
Athletes	Event	Time	Position	Time	Position	Time	Position
Tarco Llobet	Boys' 50m Breaststroke	33.19	14 Q	DNS		Did not advance	
Tarco Llobet	Boys' 100m Breaststroke	1:13.55	27	Did not advance			
Maria Lopez	Girls' 50m Freestyle	29.93	46	Did not advance			
Maria Lopez	Girls' 100m Freestyle	1:04.86	46	Did not advance			
