= Liberia at the 2010 Summer Youth Olympics =

- IOC code: LBR
- NOC: Liberia National Olympic Committee

in Singapore
- Competitors: 5 in 3 sports
- Flag bearer: Queenela Jackson

Summer Youth Olympics appearances
- 2010; 2014; 2018

Liberia competed at the 2010 Summer Youth Olympics, the inaugural Youth Olympic Games, held in Singapore from 14 August to 26 August 2010.

== Athletics ==
=== Girls ===
Track and Road Events

Athletes	Event	Qualification		Final	
Athletes	Event	Result	Rank	Result	Rank
Queenela Jackson	Girls’ 100m	13.64	29 qD	13.63	25

== Canoeing ==
Boys

Athlete	Event	Time Trial		Round 1	Round 2 (Rep)	Round 3	Round 4	Round 5	Final
Athlete	Event	Time	Rank	Round 1	Round 2 (Rep)	Round 3	Round 4	Round 5	Final
Wion Welh	Boys’ K1 Slalom	2:00.86	20	Urban (SVK); L 2:14.23-1:28.96	Liebscher (GER); L 2:11.71-1:39.82	did not advance			
Wion Welh	Boys’ K1 Sprint	DNF		did not advance					

== Swimming ==
Athletes	Event	Heat		Semifinal		Final	
Athletes	Event	Time	Position	Time	Position	Time	Position
Sima Weah	Boys’ 50m Freestyle	46.18	49	Did not advance			
Mika-Jah Teah	Boys’ 50m Freestyle	49.47	50	Did not advance			
Josephine Blamo	Girls’ 50m Freestyle	1:02.67	62	Did not advance			
Josephine Blamo	Girls’ 100m Freestyle	DNS		Did not advance			
