= Botswana at the 2010 Summer Youth Olympics =

- IOC code: BOT
- NOC: Botswana National Olympic Committee

in Singapore
- Competitors: 5 in 3 sports
- Flag bearer: Mmilili Dube
- Medals: Gold 0 Silver 0 Bronze 0 Total 0

Summer Youth Olympics appearances
- 2010; 2014; 2018

Botswana participated in the 2010 Summer Youth Olympics in Singapore.

The Botswana team consisted of five athletes competing in three sports: athletics, judo and swimming.

== Athletics ==
=== Boys ===
Field Events

Athletes	Event	Qualification		Final	
Athletes	Event	Result	Rank	Result	Rank
Mmilili Dube	Boys’ High Jump	2.04	11 qB	1.94	12

=== Girls ===
Track and Road Events

Athletes	Event	Qualification		Final	
Athletes	Event	Result	Rank	Result	Rank
Winnie George	Girls’ 1000m	DSQ qB		2:55.46	19

== Judo ==
Individual

Athlete	Event	Round 1	Round 2	Round 3	Semifinals	Final	Rank
Athlete	Event	Opposition Result	Opposition Result	Opposition Result	Opposition Result	Opposition Result	Rank
Neo Kapeko	Girls' -63 kg	Tchaniley-Larounga (TOG); W 100-000	Gomes (BRA); L 000-110	Repechage; Arrey (CMR); L 000-100	Did not advance		13

Team

Team	Event	Round 1	Round 2	Semifinals	Final	Rank
Team	Event	Opposition Result	Opposition Result	Opposition Result	Opposition Result	Rank
Birmingham; Fahariya Takidine (COM); Ecaterina Guica (CAN); Song Chol Hyon (PRK); Neo Kapenko (BOT); Chin Jie Lim (SIN); Kadijah Maxwell (BAR); Krisztian Toth (HUN)	Mixed Team	Cairo; L 2-5	Did not advance			9

== Swimming ==
Athletes	Event	Heat		Semifinal		Final	
Athletes	Event	Time	Position	Time	Position	Time	Position
Adrian Todd	Boys' 50m Freestyle	25.08	27	Did not advance			
Adrian Todd	Boys' 50m Butterfly	28.69	17	Did not advance			
Daniel Lee	Boys' 50m Freestyle	26.89	38	Did not advance			
Daniel Lee	Boys' 50m Butterfly	29.70	18	Did not advance			
