= Swimming at the 2010 Summer Youth Olympics – Boys' 50 metre freestyle =

The boys' 50 metre freestyle event at the 2010 Youth Olympic Games took place on August 17, at the Singapore Sports School.

== Medalists ==
Gold	Andrii Govorov; Ukraine	22.35
Silver	Kenneth To; Australia	22.82
Bronze	Aitor Martínez; Spain	22.83

== Heats ==
=== Heat 1 ===
Rank	Lane	Name	Nationality	Time	Notes
1	4	Cristian Quintero	Venezuela	23.41	Q
2	5	Richard Francis Regis	Grenada	27.39	
3	6	Ndjemen Touka	Cameroon	37.53	
4	2	Sima Weah	Liberia	46.18	
5	3	Mika-Jah Teah	Liberia	49.47	

=== Heat 2 ===
Rank	Lane	Name	Nationality	Time	Notes
1	1	Armando Moss	Bahamas	24.86	
2	5	Aaron Brown	Cook Islands	26.70	
3	3	Ulziibadrakh Gantulga	Mongolia	26.82	
4	6	Giordan Harris	Marshall Islands	28.43	
5	8	Abdourahman Osman	Djibouti	28.89	
6	2	Adam Kitururu	Tanzania	29.91	
7	4	Yao Amegbeto	Togo	40.50	
-	7	François Mallack	Senegal	DNS	

=== Heat 3 ===
Rank	Lane	Name	Nationality	Time	Notes
1	8	Mahfizur Rahman Sagor	Bangladesh	25.12	
2	4	Fouad Al Atrash	Palestine	26.26	
3	5	Daniel Lee	Botswana	26.89	
4	3	Dionisio Augustine	Federated States of Micronesia	27.32	
5	6	Robel Hapte	Ethiopia	28.44	
6	2	Kareem Valentine	Antigua and Barbuda	29.42	
7	1	Odam Lim	Cambodia	29.44	
–	7	Izudhaadh Ahmed	Maldives	DSQ	

=== Heat 4 ===
Rank	Lane	Name	Nationality	Time	Notes
1	5	Julien Brice	Saint Lucia	24.85	
2	7	Adrian Todd	Botswana	25.08	
3	3	Brian Forte	Jamaica	25.10	
4	4	Abbas Raad	Lebanon	25.26	
5	8	David Buruchara	Kenya	25.75	
6	1	Sergey Pevnev	Armenia	25.83	
7	2	Ahmed Al-Dulaimi	Iraq	26.09	
8	6	Abdul Allolan	Qatar	26.45	

=== Heat 5 ===
Rank	Lane	Name	Nationality	Time	Notes
1	4	Aitor Martínez	Spain	23.13	Q
2	3	Ivan Levaj	Croatia	23.34	Q
3	1	Oussama Sahnoune	Algeria	23.90	Q
4	6	Roberto Strelkov	Argentina	23.90	Q
5	2	Mans Hjelm	Sweden	24.01	
6	7	Arren Quek	Singapore	24.03	
7	8	Ahmadreza Jalali	Iran	24.43	
–	5	Tomasso Romani	Italy	DNS	

=== Heat 6 ===
Rank	Lane	Name	Nationality	Time	Notes
1	4	Andriy Govorov	Ukraine	22.62	Q
2	5	Ching Tat Lum	Hong Kong	23.30	Q
3	1	Erich Peske	United States	23.52	Q
4	3	Marius Radu	Romania	23.53	Q
5	7	Pavels Gribovskis	Latvia	23.77	Q
6	6	Cadell Lyons	Trinidad and Tobago	23.78	Q
7	8	Perry Lindo	Netherlands Antilles	24.22	
8	2	Víctor Rodrigues	Brazil	24.27	

=== Heat 7 ===
Rank	Lane	Name	Nationality	Time	Notes
1	6	Kenneth To	Australia	22.94	Q
2	5	Pjotr Degtjarjov	Estonia	23.53	Q
3	4	He Jianbin	China	23.62	Q
4	2	Kevin Leithold	Germany	23.67	Q
5	8	Yong Lim	Singapore	23.86	Q
6	3	Raphaël Stacchiotti	Luxembourg	23.98	
7	7	Juan Manuel Arbeláez	Colombia	24.12	
8	1	Omiros Zagkas	Cyprus	24.70	

== Semifinals ==
=== Semifinal 1 ===
Rank	Lane	Name	Nationality	Time	Notes
1	4	Kenneth To	Australia	22.70	Q
2	2	He Jianbin	China	23.09	Q
3	5	Ching Tat Lum	Hong Kong	23.14	Q
4	3	Cristian Quintero	Venezuela	23.25	Q
5	6	Marius Radu	Romania	23.50	
6	7	Pavels Gribovskis	Latvia	23.66	
7	1	Yong Lim	Singapore	23.87	
8	8	Oussama Sahnoune	Algeria	23.95	

=== Semifinal 2 ===
Rank	Lane	Name	Nationality	Time	Notes
1	4	Andrii Govorov	Ukraine	22.27	Q
2	5	Aitor Martínez	Spain	22.92	Q
3	3	Ivan Levaj	Croatia	23.09	Q
4	7	Kevin Leithold	Germany	23.35	Q
5	2	Pjotr Degtjarjov	Estonia	23.37	
6	6	Erich Peske	United States	23.56	
7	8	Roberto Strelkov	Argentina	23.68	
8	1	Cadell Lyons	Trinidad and Tobago	24.01	

== Final ==
Rank	Lane	Name	Nationality	Time	Notes
1st place, gold medalist(s)	4	Andriy Govorov	Ukraine	22.35	
2nd place, silver medalist(s)	5	Kenneth To	Australia	22.82	
3rd place, bronze medalist(s)	3	Aitor Martínez	Spain	22.83	
4	6	He Jianbin	China	23.01	
5	2	Ivan Levaj	Croatia	23.11	
5	7	Ching Tat Lum	Hong Kong	23.11	
7	8	Kevin Leithold	Germany	23.42	
8	1	Cristian Quintero	Venezuela	23.70	
