= Judith Sievers =

German rower

Personal information
- Born: 20 August 1992 (age 33) Flensburg, Germany
- Height: 1.84 m (6 ft 0 in)
- Weight: 70 kg (154 lb)

Sport
- Country: Germany
- Sport: Rowing
Medal record
Rowing
Representing Germany
Summer Youth Olympics
| Gold medal – first place | 2010 Singapore | Girls' single sculls |
World U23 Championships
| Silver medal – second place | 2012 Trakai | Quadruple sculls |
World Junior Championships
| Gold medal – first place | 2010 Racice | Single sculls |
| Bronze medal – third place | 2009 Brive-la-Gaillarde | Quadruple sculls |

Judith Sievers (born 20 August 1992) is a retired German rower who competed at international elite events. She was a Youth Olympic and a World Junior champion in the single sculls.

Sievers retired from rowing in 2013 due to reoccurring back problems.
