= Albania at the 2010 Summer Youth Olympics =

- IOC code: ALB
- NOC: Albanian National Olympic Committee
- Website: nocalbania.org.al

in Singapore
- Competitors: 4 in 4 sports
- Flag bearer: Julanda Bacaj
- Medals: Gold 0 Silver 0 Bronze 0 Total 0

Summer Youth Olympics appearances (overview)
- 2010; 2014; 2018

Albania participated in the 2010 Summer Youth Olympics in Singapore.

The Albanian team consisted of 4 athletes competing in 4 sports: athletics, judo, rowing and swimming.

== Athletics ==
Note: The athletes who do not have a "Q" next to their Qualification Rank advance to a non-medal ranking final.

=== Boys ===
Track and road events

Event	Athletes	Qualification		Final	
Event	Athletes	Result	Rank	Result	Rank
Boys' 100m	Julsian Gega	DSQ qE		DNS	

== Judo ==
Individual

Athlete	Event	Round 1	Round 2	Round 3	Semifinals	Final	Rank
Athlete	Event	Opposition Result	Opposition Result	Opposition Result	Opposition Result	Opposition Result	Rank
Julanda Bacaj	Girls' -63 kg	BYE	Dilara Incedayi (TUR); L 000-101	Repechage; Gaelle Nemorin (MRI); L 000-101	Did not advance		13

Team

Team	Event	Round 1	Round 2	Semifinals	Final	Rank
Team	Event	Opposition Result	Opposition Result	Opposition Result	Opposition Result	Rank
New York; Katelyn Bouyssou (USA); Dmytro Atanov (UKR); Julanda Bacaj (ALB); Matheus Marcia Machado (BRA); Dilara Incedayi (TUR); Ghenadie Pretivatii (MDA); Milica Savic (BIH); Mateja Glusac (SRB)	Mixed Team	BYE	Tokyo; L 4-4 (2-3)	Did not advance		5

== Rowing ==
Junior's men

Athlete(s)	Event	Heats		Repechage		Semifinals		Final	
Athlete(s)	Event	Time	Rank	Time	Rank	Time	Rank	Time	Overall Rank
Marsel Nikaj	Single sculls	3:28.75	3 R	3:29.47	2 S A/B	3:34.61	5 FB	3:31.61	10

== Swimming ==
Girls'

Athletes	Event	Heat		Semifinal		Final	
Athletes	Event	Time	Position	Time	Position	Time	Position
Reni Jani	50m freestyle	30.99	49	Did not advance			
Reni Jani	50m butterfly	34.43	22	Did not advance			
