= Latvia at the 2010 Summer Youth Olympics =

- IOC code: LAT
- NOC: Latvian Olympic Committee
- Website: www.olimpiade.lv

in Singapore
- Competitors: 11 in 7 sports
- Flag bearer: Kristers Taims
- Medals Ranked 84th: Gold 0 Silver 0 Bronze 1 Total 1

Summer Youth Olympics appearances
- 2010; 2014; 2018

Latvia participated in the 2010 Summer Youth Olympics in Singapore.

== Medalists ==
Medal	Name	Sport	Event	Date
Bronze	Intars Išejevs	Athletics	Boys' Javelin throw	22 Aug

== Athletics ==
Boys

Athlete(s)	Event	Qualification		Final	
Athlete(s)	Event	Result	Rank	Result	Rank
Intars Išejevs	Boys' Javelin throw	73.42m	5th Q	74.23m PB	Bronze medal

== Cycling ==
Cross Country

Athlete	Event	Time	Rank	Points
Andris Vosekalns	Boys' Cross Country	1:06:47	21	72
Lija Laizāne	Girls' Cross Country	55:05	12	34

Time Trial

Athlete	Event	Time	Rank	Points
Aleksandrs Kurbatskis	Boys' Time Trial	4:31.92	29	30
Lija Laizāne	Girls' Time Trial	3:36.31	9	27

BMX

Athlete	Event	Seeding Round		Quarterfinals							Semifinals							Final		
Athlete	Event	Seeding Round		Run 1		Run 2		Run 3		Rank	Run 1		Run 2		Run 3		Rank	Final		
Athlete	Event	Time	Rank	Time	Rank	Time	Rank	Time	Rank	Rank	Time	Rank	Time	Rank	Time	Rank	Rank	Time	Rank	Points
Kristers Taims	Boys' BMX	32.420	8	32.944	3	32.466	2	32.387	3	2 Q	32.992	4	35.741	3	32.542	3	3 Q	32.329	6	35
Lija Laizāne	Girls' BMX	49.611	21	49.763	7	49.176	6	48.447	7	7	Did not advance									40

Road Race

Athlete	Event	Time	Rank	Points
Andris Vosekalns	Boys' Road Race	1:05:44	48	67*
Aleksandrs Kurbatskis	Boys' Road Race	1:15:40	59	
Kristers Taims	Boys' Road Race	1:16:48	64	

Overall

Team	Event	Cross Country Pts		Time Trial Pts		BMX Pts		Road Race Pts	Total	Rank
Team	Event	Boys	Girls	Boys	Girls	Boys	Girls	Road Race Pts	Total	Rank
Lija Laizāne; Andris Vosekalns; Aleksandrs Kurbatskis; Kristers Taims	Mixed Team	72	34	30	27	35	40	67*	305	17

- * Received -5 for finishing road race with all three racers

== Modern pentathlon ==
Athlete	Event	Fencing (épée one touch)			Swimming (200m freestyle)			Running & Shooting (3000m, Laser Pistol)			Total points	Final rank
Athlete	Event	Results	Rank	Points	Time	Rank	Points	Time	Rank	Points	Total points	Final rank
Sindija Roga	Girls' Individual	9-14	14	720	2:27.96	19	1028	14:03.83	19	1628	3376	20
Sindija Roga (LAT); Gergely Demeter (HUN)	Mixed Relay	34-58	24	700	2:03.78	6	1316	17:03.05	22	1988	4004	22

== Rowing ==
Girls

Athlete(s)	Event	Heats		Repechage		Semifinals		Final	
Athlete(s)	Event	Time	Rank	Time	Rank	Time	Rank	Time	Rank
Elza Gulbe	Single sculls	3:47.52	2nd	3:58.15	1st Q	3:56.85	3rd Q	3:45.60	4th

== Sailing ==
Windsurfing

Athlete	Event	Race											Points	Rank
Athlete	Event	1	2	3	4	5	6	7	8	9	10	M*	Points	Rank
Ronalds Kaups	Boys' Techno 293	9	15	16	10	13	~~17~~	9	8	14	15	19	128	13

== Swimming ==
Boys

Athletes	Events	Heat		Semifinal		Final	
Athletes	Events	Time	Position	Time	Position	Time	Position
Pāvels Gribovskis	Boys' 50m Freestyle	23.77	12th Q	23.66	12th	Did not advance	

Girls

Athlete(s)	Events	Heat		Semifinal		Final	
Athlete(s)	Events	Time	Position	Time	Position	Time	Position
Gabriela Ņikitina	Girls’ 50m Freestyle	27.10	17th	Did not advance			
Gabriela Ņikitina	Girls 100m Backstroke	1:06.30	24th	Did not advance			

== Weightlifting ==
Boys

Athlete(s)	Event	Snatch		Clean & jerk		Total	Rank
Athlete(s)	Event	Result	Rank	Result	Rank	Total	Rank
Artjoms Žerebkovs	56 kg	98	6th	128	4th	226	4th
