= Cyprus at the 2010 Summer Youth Olympics =

- IOC code: CYP
- NOC: Cyprus Olympic Committee
- Website: olympic.org.cy

in Singapore
- Competitors: 9 in 4 sports
- Flag bearer: Michalis Krasias
- Medals Ranked 74th: Gold 0 Silver 1 Bronze 0 Total 1

Summer Youth Olympics appearances
- 2010; 2014; 2018

Cyprus participated the 2010 Summer Youth Olympics in Singapore.

== Medalists ==
Medal	Name	Sport	Event	Date
Silver	Alexandros Poursanidis	Athletics	Boys' Hammer throw	23 Aug

== Athletics ==
=== Boys ===
Field Events

Athletes	Event	Qualification		Final	
Athletes	Event	Result	Rank	Result	Rank
Alexandros Poursanidis	Boys’ Hammer Throw	67.24	8 Q	70.30	Silver medal

=== Girls ===
Field Events

Athletes	Event	Qualification		Final	
Athletes	Event	Result	Rank	Result	Rank
Leontia Kallenou	Girls’ High Jump	1.76	6 Q	1.79	4

== Cycling ==
Cross Country

Athlete	Event	Time	Rank	Points
Leontios Katsouris	Boys’ Cross Country	-5LAP	32	72
Antri Christoforou	Girls’ Cross Country	54:11	9	27

Time Trial

Athlete	Event	Time	Rank	Points
Eirinaios Koutsiou	Boys’ Time Trial	4:29.15	27	30
Antri Christoforou	Girls’ Time Trial	3:31.10	6	18

BMX

Athlete	Event	Seeding Round		Quarterfinals							Semifinals							Final		
Athlete	Event	Seeding Round		Run 1		Run 2		Run 3		Rank	Run 1		Run 2		Run 3		Rank	Final		
Athlete	Event	Time	Rank	Time	Rank	Time	Rank	Time	Rank	Rank	Time	Rank	Time	Rank	Time	Rank	Rank	Time	Rank	Points
Mamas Kyriacou	Boys’ BMX	51.907	29	54.102	7	51.795	8	51.088	8	8	Did not advance									72
Antri Christoforou	Girls’ BMX	56.479	28	53.777	8	53.878	8	54.308	8	8	Did not advance									40

Road Race

Athlete	Event	Time	Rank	Points
Leontios Katsouris	Boys’ Road Race	1:05:44	38	72
Eirinaios Koutsiou	Boys’ Road Race	1:14:02	56	
Mamas Kyriacou	Boys’ Road Race	DNF		

Overall

Team	Event	Cross Country Pts		Time Trial Pts		BMX Pts		Road Race Pts	Total	Rank
Team	Event	Boys	Girls	Boys	Girls	Boys	Girls	Road Race Pts	Total	Rank
Antri Christoforou; Leontios Katsouris; Eirinaios Koutsiou; Mamas Kyriacou	Mixed Team	72	27	30	18	72	40	72	331	23

== Gymnastics ==
=== Artistic Gymnastics ===
Boys

Athlete	Event	Floor		Pommel Horse		Rings		Vault		Parallel Bars		Horizontal Bar		Total	
Athlete	Event	Score	Rank	Score	Rank	Score	Rank	Score	Rank	Score	Rank	Score	Rank	Score	Rank
Michalis Krasias	Boys' Qualification	13.600	20	13.200	17	13.800	13	14.700	33	12.850	24	13.300	17	81.450	16 Q
Michalis Krasias	Boys' Individual All-Around	13.550	12	11.500	17	13.200	15	14.600	17	12.500	17	12.800	18	78.150	18

== Swimming ==
Athletes	Event	Heat		Semifinal		Final	
Athletes	Event	Time	Position	Time	Position	Time	Position
Omiros Zagkas	Boys' 50m Freestyle	24.70	24	Did not advance			
Anna Schegoleva	Girls' 50m Butterfly	28.57	12 Q	28.80	15	Did not advance	
Anna Schegoleva	Girls' 100m Butterfly	1:02.92	19	Did not advance			
Anna Schegoleva	Girls' 200m Butterfly	DNS				Did not advance	
