= Togo at the 2010 Summer Youth Olympics =

- IOC code: TOG
- NOC: Comité National Olympique Togolais

in Singapore
- Competitors: 4 in 4 sports
- Flag bearer: Pouwedeou Adjodi

Summer Youth Olympics appearances
- 2010; 2014; 2018

Togo competed at the 2010 Summer Youth Olympics, the inaugural Youth Olympic Games, held in Singapore from 14 August to 26 August 2010.

== Athletics ==
=== Girls ===
Track and Road Events

Athletes	Event	Qualification		Final	
Athletes	Event	Result	Rank	Result	Rank
Pouwedeou Adjodi	Girls’ 1000m	3:02.63	14 Q	3:00.52	15

== Judo ==
Individual

Athlete	Event	Round 1	Round 2	Round 3	Semifinals	Final	Rank
Athlete	Event	Opposition Result	Opposition Result	Opposition Result	Opposition Result	Opposition Result	Rank
Djamila Tchaniley-Larounga	Girls' -63 kg	Kapeko (BOT); L 000-100	Repechage; Baxter (NZL); L 000-100	did not advance			17

== Swimming ==
Athletes	Event	Heat		Semifinal		Final	
Athletes	Event	Time	Position	Time	Position	Time	Position
Yao Messa Roger Amegbeto	Boys’ 50m Freestyle	40.50	48	Did not advance			
Yao Messa Roger Amegbeto	Boys’ 50m Breaststroke	DSQ		Did not advance			

== Taekwondo ==
Athlete	Event	Preliminary	Quarterfinal	Semifinal	Final	Rank
Michele Dorkenoo	Girls' -55kg	Kaburee Ioane (KIR); L RSC R2 1:16	did not advance			9
