= Rowing at the 2010 Summer Youth Olympics – Girls' single sculls =

These are the results of the Junior Women's Single Sculls event at the 2010 Summer Youth Olympics.

== Medalists ==
Gold	Silver	Bronze
Judith Sievers; Germany	Nataliia Kovalova; Ukraine	Noemie Kober; France

== Schedule ==
All times are China Standard Time (UTC+8)

Date	Time	Round
Sunday, August 15, 2010	10:00-10:40	Heats
Monday, August 16, 2010	10:00-10:40	Repechage
Tuesday, August 17, 2010	10:00-10:20	Semifinals C/D
Tuesday, August 17, 2010	10:20-10:40	Semifinals A/B
Wednesday, August 18, 2010	10:00-10:10	Final D
Wednesday, August 18, 2010	10:20-10:30	Final C
Wednesday, August 18, 2010	10:40-10:50	Final B
Wednesday, August 18, 2010	11:20-11:30	Final A

== Results ==
=== Heats ===
- Qualification Rules: 1->SA/B, 2..->R

==== Heat 1 ====
August 15, 10:00

Rank	Athlete	Country	Time	Notes
1	Ainee Hernandez Delgado	Cuba	3:46.93	Q - SA/B
2	Annick Taselaar	Netherlands	3:48.57	R
3	Alara Dirik	Turkey	3:59.14	R
4	Joanna Lai Cheng Chan	Singapore	4:04.54	R
5	Jovana Arsić	Serbia	4:04.97	R
6	Jana Hausberger	Austria	4:07.85	R

==== Heat 2 ====
August 15, 10:10

Rank	Athlete	Country	Time	Notes
1	Noemie Kober	France	3:50.09	Q - SA/B
2	Denise Walsh	Ireland	3:56.55	R
3	Garazi Bilbao	Spain	3:59.72	R
4	Ebba Sundberg	Sweden	4:01.24	R
5	Eglit Võsu	Estonia	4:01.25	R
6	Sae Kitayama	Japan	4:03.14	R

==== Heat 3 ====
August 15, 10:20

Rank	Athlete	Country	Time	Notes
1	Judith Sievers	Germany	3:45.41	Q - SA/B
2	Elza Gulbe	Latvia	3:47.52	R
3	Nataliia Kovalova	Ukraine	3:48.47	R
4	Tarin Čokelj	Slovenia	3:59.18	R
5	Muram Ali	Sudan	5:12.05	R

==== Heat 4 ====
August 15, 10:30

Rank	Athlete	Country	Time	Notes
1	Kristýna Fleissnerová	Czech Republic	3:49.37	Q - SA/B
2	Asja Zero	Croatia	3:51.21	R
3	Cao Ting	China	3:54.83	R
4	Eveline Peleman	Belgium	3:57.23	R
5	Patricia Rodrigues Batista	Portugal	4:05.64	R

=== Repechage ===
- Qualification Rules: 1-2->SA/B, 3..->SC/D

==== Repechage 1 ====
August 16, 10:30

Rank	Athlete	Country	Time	Notes
1	Natalia Kovalova	Ukraine	3:55.98	Q - SA/B
2	Asja Zero	Croatia	4:00.95	Q - SA/B
3	Jovana Arsić	Serbia	4:07.89	Q - SC/D
4	Ebba Sundberg	Sweden	4:15.77	Q - SC/D

==== Repechage 2 ====
August 16, 10:40

Rank	Athlete	Country	Time	Notes
1	Elza Gulbe	Latvia	3:58.15	Q - SA/B
2	Garazi Bilbao	Spain	4:06.04	Q - SA/B
3	Patricia Rodrigues Batista	Portugal	4:11.61	Q - SC/D
4	Joanna Lai Cheng Chan	Singapore	4:12.77	Q - SC/D

==== Repechage 3 ====
August 16, 10:50

Rank	Athlete	Country	Time	Notes
1	Alara Dirik	Turkey	4:03.78	Q - SA/B
2	Denise Walsh	Ireland	4:05.00	Q - SA/B
3	Eveline Peleman	Belgium	4:08.69	Q - SC/D
4	Sae Kitayama	Japan	4:09.90	Q - SC/D
5	Muram Ali	Sudan		DNF

==== Repechage 4 ====
August 16, 11:00

Rank	Athlete	Country	Time	Notes
1	Cao Ting	China	3:56.58	Q - SA/B
2	Annick Taselaar	Netherlands	3:57.11	Q - SA/B
3	Tarin Čokelj	Slovenia	4:01.99	Q - SC/D
4	Eglit Võsu	Estonia	4:04.16	Q - SC/D
5	Jana Hausberger	Austria	4:13.68	Q - SC/D

=== Semifinals C/D ===
- Qualification Rules: 1-3->FC, 4..->FD

==== Semifinal C/D 1 ====
August 17, 10:00

Rank	Athlete	Country	Time	Notes
1	Jovana Arsić	Serbia	4:13.45	Q - FC
2	Eglit Võsu	Estonia	4:13.50	Q - FC
3	Eveline Peleman	Belgium	4:16.25	Q - FC
4	Joanna Lai Cheng Chan	Singapore	4:19.58	Q - FD
5	Muram Ali	Sudan	5:38.81	Q - FD

==== Semifinal C/D 2 ====
August 17, 10:10

Rank	Athlete	Country	Time	Notes
1	Tarin Čokelj	Slovenia	4:10.63	Q - FC
2	Ebba Sundberg	Sweden	4:15.63	Q - FC
3	Sae Kitayama	Japan	4:16.02	Q - FC
4	Jana Hauserberger	Austria	4:18.94	Q - FD
5	Patricia Rodrigues Batista	Portugal	4:19.48	Q - FD

=== Semifinals A/B ===
- Qualification Rules: 1-3->FA, 4..->FB

==== Semifinal A/B 1 ====
August 17, 10:45

Rank	Athlete	Country	Time	Notes
1	Judith Sieverg	Germany	3:56.28	Q - FA
2	Cao Ting	China	3:56.61	Q - FA
3	Elza Gulbe	Latvia	3:56.85	Q - FA
4	Ainee Hernandez Delgado	Cuba	3:57.13	Q - FB
5	Asja Zero	Croatia	4:00.78	Q - FB
6	Denise Walsh	Ireland	4:10.04	Q - FB

==== Semifinal A/B 2 ====
August 17, 10:55

Rank	Athlete	Country	Time	Notes
1	Noemie Kober	France	3:52.04	Q - FA
2	Natalia Kovalova	Ukraine	3:53.58	Q - FA
3	Annick Taselaar	Netherlands	3:54.45	Q - FA
4	Kristýna Fleissnerová	Czech Republic	3:55.02	Q - FB
5	Alara Dirik	Turkey	4:03.41	Q - FB
6	Garazi Bilbao	Spain	4:06.11	Q - FB

=== Finals ===
==== Final D ====
August 18, 10:00

Rank	Athlete	Country	Time	Notes
1	Joanna Lai Cheng Chan	Singapore	4:12.58	
2	Jana Hausberger	Austria	4:13.73	
3	Patricia Rodrigues Batista	Portugal	4:16.08	
4	Muram Ali	Sudan	5:29.10	

==== Final C ====
August 18, 10:20

Rank	Athlete	Country	Time	Notes
1	Tarin Čokelj	Slovenia	4:09.09	
2	Jovana Aršić	Serbia	4:11.26	
3	Eglit Võsu	Estonia	4:11.47	
4	Eveline Peleman	Belgium	4:12.33	
5	Sae Kitayama	Japan	4:16.43	
6	Ebba Sundberg	Sweden	4:17.39	

==== Final B ====
August 18, 10:40

Rank	Athlete	Country	Time	Notes
1	Ainee Hernandez Delgado	Cuba	3:49.13	
2	Asja Zero	Croatia	3:50.13	
3	Kristýna Fleissnerová	Czech Republic	3:53.38	
4	Garazi Bilbao	Spain	4:00.93	
5	Alara Dirik	Turkey	4:03.03	
6	Denise Walsh	Ireland		DNS

==== Final A ====
August 18, 11:30

Rank	Athlete	Country	Time	Notes
1st place, gold medalist(s)	Judith Sievers	Germany	3:44.21	
2nd place, silver medalist(s)	Nataliia Kovalova	Ukraine	3:44.63	
3rd place, bronze medalist(s)	Noemie Kober	France	3:44.80	
4	Elza Gulbe	Latvia	3:45.60	
5	Annick Taselaar	Netherlands	3:52.08	
6	Cao Ting	China	3:55.48	
