= Athletics at the 2010 Summer Youth Olympics – Boys' hammer throw =

Athletics – Boys' hammer throw at the I Summer Youth Olympic Games
- Venue: Bishan Stadium
- Date: August 19–23
- Competitors: 15 from 15 nations

Medalists
1st place, gold medalist(s)		Liu Binbin	China
2nd place, silver medalist(s)		Alexandros Poursanidis	Cyprus
3rd place, bronze medalist(s)		Balazs Toreky	Hungary

The boys' hammer throw competition at the 2010 Youth Olympic Games was held on 19–23 August 2010 in Bishan Stadium.

== Schedule ==
Date	Time	Round
19 August 2010	09:00	Qualification
23 August 2010	10:10	Final

== Results ==
=== Qualification ===
Rank	Athlete	1	2	3	4	Result	Notes	Q
1	Eslam Ibrahim (EGY)	69.32	73.42	x	x	73.42		FA
2	Daniel Alejandro Cruz Garcia (CUB)	x	70.11	72.17	71.25	72.17		FA
3	Martynas Sedys (LTU)	72.15	64.21	69.52	70.05	72.15	PB	FA
4	Balazs Toreky (HUN)	66.72	71.30	70.97	65.28	71.30		FA
5	Liu Binbin (CHN)	67.17	x	70.33	69.54	70.33		FA
6	Sebastian Dobkowski (POL)	x	70.13	x	x	70.13		FA
7	Nektarios Fylladitakis (GRE)	64.04	66.59	68.67	67.85	68.67		FA
8	Alexandros Poursanidis (CYP)	66.08	67.24	x	x	67.24		FA
9	Abduqodir Barotov (TJK)	64.49	65.94	66.96	64.67	66.96	PB	FB
10	Diego del Real (MEX)	x	x	66.44	x	66.44		FB
11	Sergiy Regeda (UKR)	x	65.66	66.02	x	66.02		FB
12	Andrew Elkins (GBR)	59.97	64.90	x	65.86	65.86		FB
13	Stiaan Minnie (RSA)	x	60.55	x	62.31	62.31		FB
	Ilmari Lahtinen (FIN)	x	x	x	x	NM		FB
	Jaromir Pumr (CZE)	x	x	x	x	NM		FB

=== Finals ===
==== Final B ====
Rank	Athlete	1	2	3	4	Result	Notes
1	Diego del Real (MEX)	65.48	66.21	x	69.66	69.66	
2	Andrew Elkins (GBR)	64.58	65.35	65.61	67.77	67.77	
3	Abduqodir Barotov (TJK)	65.92	62.44	x	64.09	65.92	
4	Ilmari Lahtinen (FIN)	64.72	x	x	x	64.72	
5	Jaromir Pumr (CZE)	63.78	x	62.71	x	63.78	
6	Stiaan Minnie (RSA)	54.65	62.11	63.30	x	63.30	
	Sergiy Regeda (UKR)	x	x	x	x	NM	

==== Final A ====
Rank	Athlete	1	2	3	4	Result	Notes
1st place, gold medalist(s)	Liu Binbin (CHN)	70.82	73.57	x	73.99	73.99	PB
2nd place, silver medalist(s)	Alexandros Poursanidis (CYP)	63.16	65.91	70.30	x	70.30	
3rd place, bronze medalist(s)	Balazs Toreky (HUN)	67.70	x	70.13	66.50	70.13	
4	Sebastian Dobkowski (POL)	61.83	67.53	68.71	69.54	69.54	
5	Martynas Sedys (LTU)	62.71	X	63.48	68.57	68.57	
6	Eslam Ibrahim (EGY)	x	x	63.75	x	63.75	
7	Daniel Alejandro Cruz Garcia (CUB)	x	61.70	62.42	x	62.42	
8	Nektarios Fylladitakis (GRE)	x	x	x	57.59	57.59	
