= Swimming at the 2010 Summer Youth Olympics – Boys' 50 metre breaststroke =

The men's 50 metre breaststroke heats and semifinals at the 2010 Youth Olympic Games took place on August 19 with the final on August 20 at the Singapore Sports School.

== Medalists ==
Gold	Ivan Capan; Croatia	28.55
Silver	Nicholas Schafer; Australia	28.59
Bronze	Razvan Tudosie; Romania	28.69

== Heats ==
=== Heat 1 ===
Rank	Lane	Name	Nationality	Time	Notes
1	5	Nicholas Schafer	Australia	28.82	Q
2	4	Vaidotas Blažys	Lithuania	29.74	Q
3	6	Sheng Jun Pang	Singapore	30.36	Q
4	7	Tarco Llobet	Bolivia	33.19	Q
	2	Yao Messa Roger Amegbeto	Togo		DSQ
6	3	Yun Ching Il	North Korea		DSQ

=== Heat 2 ===
Rank	Lane	Name	Nationality	Time	Notes
1	5	Razvan Tudosie	Romania	28.74	Q
2	4	Anton Lobanov	Russia	28.93	Q
3	3	Imri Ganiel	Israel	29.52	Q
4	6	Timo Vaimann	Estonia	30.37	Q
5	7	Mohamed Camara	Guinea	35.56	Q
6	2	Nts´Eke Setho	Lesotho	36.56	Q,NR

=== Heat 3 ===
Rank	Lane	Name	Nationality	Time	Notes
1	5	Ivan Capan	Croatia	29.15	Q
2	4	Ioannis Karpouzlis	Greece	29.17	Q
3	6	Flavio Bizzarri	Italy	29.41	Q
4	3	Vinicius Borges	Brazil	29.73	Q
5	7	Simon Beck	Liechtenstein	31.36	Q
6	2	Ian Nakmai	Papua New Guinea	32.06	Q
7	1	Joachim Ofosuhena-Wise	Ghana	36.80	

== Semifinals ==
=== Semifinal 1 ===
Rank	Lane	Name	Nationality	Time	Notes
1	4	Nicholas Schafer	Australia	28.83	Q
2	5	Ivan Capan	Croatia	29.10	Q
3	3	Flavio Bizzarri	Italy	29.46	Q
4	6	Vinicius Borges	Brazil	29.75	
5	2	Sheng Jun Pang	Singapore	30.11	
6	7	Simon Beck	Liechtenstein	31.31	
7	8	Nts´Eke Setho	Lesotho	35.57	NR
	1	Tarco Llobet	Bolivia		DNS

=== Semifinal 2 ===
Rank	Lane	Name	Nationality	Time	Notes
1	5	Anton Lobanov	Russia	28.87	Q
2	4	Razvan Tudosie	Romania	28.92	Q
3	3	Ioannis Karpouzlis	Greece	29.04	Q
4	6	Imri Ganiel	Israel	29.21	Q
5	2	Vaidotas Blazys	Lithuania	29.58	Q
6	7	Timo Vaimann	Estonia	30.75	
7	1	Ian Nakmai	Papua New Guinea	31.66	
8	8	Mohamed Camara	Guinea	35.17	

== Final ==
Rank	Lane	Name	Nationality	Time	Notes
1st place, gold medalist(s)	2	Ivan Capan	Croatia	28.55	
2nd place, silver medalist(s)	4	Nicholas Schafer	Australia	28.59	
3rd place, bronze medalist(s)	3	Razvan Tudosie	Romania	28.69	
4	5	Anton Lobanov	Russia	28.76	
5	6	Ioannis Karpouzlis	Greece	29.05	
6	7	Imri Ganiel	Israel	29.45	
7	1	Flavio Bizzarri	Italy	29.56	
8	8	Vaidotas Blazys	Lithuania	29.71	
