= Rowing at the 2010 Summer Youth Olympics – Boys' single sculls =

These are the results of the Junior Men's Single Sculls event at the 2010 Summer Youth Olympics.

== Medalists ==
Gold	Silver	Bronze
Rolandas Maščinskas; Lithuania	Felix Bach; Germany	Ioan Prundeanu; Romania

== Schedule ==
All times are China Standard Time (UTC+8)

Date	Time	Round
Sunday, August 15, 2010	10:40-11:20	Heats
Monday, August 16, 2010	10:40-11:20	Repechage
Tuesday, August 17, 2010	10:40-11:00	Semifinals C/D
Tuesday, August 17, 2010	11:00-11:20	Semifinals A/B
Wednesday, August 18, 2010	10:10-10:20	Final D
Wednesday, August 18, 2010	10:30-10:40	Final C
Wednesday, August 18, 2010	10:50-11:00	Final B
Wednesday, August 18, 2010	11:30-11:40	Final A

== Results ==
=== Heats ===
- Qualification Rules: 1->SA/B, 2..->R

==== Heat 1 ====
August 15, 10:40

Rank	Athlete	Country	Time	Notes
1	Felix Bach	Germany	3:22.25	Q - S A/B
2	Zeng Yueqi	China	3:26.64	R
3	Facundo Torres	Argentina	3:27.20	R
4	Konrad Raczynski	Poland	3:27.33	R
5	Paul Sieber	Austria	3:29.05	R
6	Mohamed Fares Laouti	Tunisia	3:37.29	R

==== Heat 2 ====
August 15, 10:50

Rank	Athlete	Country	Time	Notes
1	Ioan Prundeanu	Romania	3:22.59	Q - S A/B
2	Tiago Braga	Brazil	3:26.01	R
3	Marsel Nikaj	Albania	3:28.75	R
4	Hayden Cohen	New Zealand	3:30.65	R
5	Bastiaan Vervoort	Netherlands	3:31.07	R
6	Musab Badawi	Sudan	4:04.73	R

==== Heat 3 ====
August 15, 11:00

Rank	Athlete	Country	Time	Notes
1	Andre Redr	Slovakia	3:27.54	Q - S A/B
2	Mark Biro	Hungary	3:29.91	R
3	Roberto Lopez	El Salvador	3:30.53	R
4	Martin Slavik	Czech Republic	3:34.09	R
5	Simon Soerensen	Denmark	3:41.55	R

==== Heat 4 ====
August 15, 11:10

Rank	Athlete	Country	Time	Notes
1	Rolandas Maščinskas	Lithuania	3:22.68	Q - S A/B
2	Iurii Ivanov	Ukraine	3:25.07	R
3	Jean-Benoit Valscherts	Belgium	3:28.79	R
4	Augustin Maillefer	Switzerland	3:32.84	R
5	Nadzrie Hyckell Hamzah	Singapore	3:40.00	R

=== Repechage ===
- Qualification Rules: 1-2->SA/B, 3..->SC/D

==== Repechage 1 ====
August 16, 10:40

Rank	Athlete	Country	Time	Notes
1	Zeng Yueqi	China	3:27.38	Q - SA/B
2	Marsel Nikaj	Albania	3:29.47	Q - SA/B
3	Martin Slavik	Czech Republic	3:32.92	SC/D
4	Mohamed Fares Laouti	Tunisia	3:38.38	SC/D
5	Nadzrie Hyckell Hamzah	Singapore	3:44.10	SC/D

==== Repechage 2 ====
August 16, 10:50

Rank	Athlete	Country	Time	Notes
1	Tiago Braga	Brazil	3:34.62	Q - SA/B
2	Augustin Maillefer	Switzerland	3:35.35	Q - SA/B
3	Roberto Lopez	El Salvador	3:35.36	SC/D
4	Paul Sieber	Austria	3:36.96	SC/D
5	Musab Badawi	Sudan	4:15.44	SC/D

==== Repechage 3 ====
August 16, 11:00

Rank	Athlete	Country	Time	Notes
1	Mark Biro	Hungary	3:34.31	Q - SA/B
2	Bastiaan Vervoort	Netherlands	3:34.77	Q - SA/B
3	Jean-Benoit Valscherts	Belgium	3:35.50	SC/D
4	Konrad Raczynski	Poland	3:42.72	SC/D

==== Repechage 4 ====
August 16, 11:10

Rank	Athlete	Country	Time	Notes
1	Iurii Ivanov	Ukraine	3:33.14	Q - SA/B
2	Hayden Cohen	New Zealand	3:36.95	Q - SA/B
3	Simon Soerensen	Denmark	3:45.69	SC/D
4	Facundo Torres	Argentina	3:51.49	SC/D

=== Semifinals C/D ===
- Qualification Rules: 1-3->FC, 4..->FD

==== Semifinal C/D 1 ====
August 17, 10:20

Rank	Athlete	Country	Time	Notes
1	Paul Sieber	Austria	3:43.00	Q - FC
2	Konrad Raczynski	Poland	3:45.04	Q - FC
3	Martin Slavik	Czech Republic	3:45.13	Q - FC
4	Simon Soerensen	Denmark	3:48.80	Q - FD
5	Nadzrie Hyckell Hamzah	Singapore	3:55.80	Q - FD

==== Semifinal C/D 2 ====
August 17, 10:30

Rank	Athlete	Country	Time	Notes
1	Roberto Lopez	El Salvador	3:42.94	Q - FC
2	Jean-Benoit Valschaerts	Belgium	3:46.62	Q - FC
3	Mohamed Fares Laouiti	Tunisia	3:47.69	Q - FC
4	Musab Badawi	Sudan	4:21.74	Q - FD
5	Facundo Torres	Argentina		DNS

=== Semifinals A/B ===
- Qualification Rules: 1-3->FA, 4..->FB

==== Semifinal A/B 1 ====
August 17, 11:05

Rank	Athlete	Country	Time	Notes
1	Felix Bach	Germany	3:23.15	Q - FA
2	Ioan Prundeanu	Romania	3:25.16	Q - FA
3	Iurii Ivanov	Ukraine	3:28.11	Q - FA
4	Mark Biro	Hungary	3:34.40	Q - FB
5	Marsel Nikaj	Albania	3:34.61	Q - FB
6	Augustin Maillefer	Switzerland	3:39.76	Q - FB

==== Semifinal A/B 2 ====
August 17, 11:15

Rank	Athlete	Country	Time	Notes
1	Rolandas Maščinskas	Lithuania	3:25.71	Q - FA
2	Zeng Yueqi	China	3:27.38	Q - FA
3	Tiago Braga	Brazil	3:30.52	Q - FA
4	Hayden Cohen	New Zealand	3:35.38	Q - FB
5	Andre Redr	Slovakia	3:36.12	Q - FB
6	Bastiaan Vervoort	Netherlands	3:36.58	Q - FB

=== Finals ===
==== Final D ====
August 18, 10:10

Rank	Athlete	Country	Time	Notes
1	Simon Soerensen	Denmark	3:51.77	
2	Nadzrie Hyckell Hamzah	Singapore	3:56.66	
3	Musab Badawi	Sudan	4:22.65	

==== Final C ====
August 18, 10:30

Rank	Athlete	Country	Time	Notes
1	Roberto Lopez	El Salvador	3:33.72	
2	Jean-Benoit Valschaerts	Belgium	3:35.95	
3	Paul Sieber	Austria	3:36.56	
4	Martin Slavik	Czech Republic	3:36.91	
5	Konrad Raczynski	Poland	3:42.40	
6	Mohamed Fares Laouiti	Tunisia	3:44.37	

==== Final B ====
August 18, 10:50

Rank	Athlete	Country	Time	Notes
1	Mark Biro	Hungary	3:28.00	
2	Hayden Cohen	New Zealand	3:28.04	
3	Augustin Maillefer	Switzerland	3:30.61	
4	Marsel Nikaj	Albania	3:31.61	
5	Bastiaan Vervoort	Netherlands	3:36.20	
6	Andre Redr	Slovakia		DNS

==== Final A ====
August 18, 11:40

Rank	Athlete	Country	Time	Notes
1st place, gold medalist(s)	Rolandas Maščinskas	Lithuania	3:13.82	
2nd place, silver medalist(s)	Felix Bach	Germany	3:16.23	
3rd place, bronze medalist(s)	Ioan Prundeanu	Romania	3:19.11	
4	Zeng Yueqi	China	3:24.62	
5	Tiago Braga	Brazil	3:27.73	
6	Iurii Ivanov	Ukraine	3:27.98	
