= 2010 Copa Simón Bolívar (Bolivia) =

Copa Simón Bolívar
- Season: 2010
- Champions: Nacional Potosi (2nd Title)
- Promoted: Nacional Potosi; Real America (Relegation/promotion playoff)
- Matches: 52
- Goals: 187 (3.6 per match)

2010 was the 22nd season of the Copa Simon Bolivar as a Second Division Tournament. In the previous season, Guabira was promoted after Ciclón had points deducted by the Bolivian Football Federation. After that the Ciclon manager was sacked for making that kind of error in a semi-professional match. The tournament started on the 6 August 2010. Most of the matches in Group C were broadcast on TV

== Champions and runner-up from Primera A ==
Santa Cruz
Champions	Runner-up
Real America (1st)	Callejas (2nd)
La Paz
Mariscal Braun (1st)	ABB (2nd)
Cochabamba
Enrique Happ (1st)	Bata (2nd)
Chuquisaca
Independiente Petrolero (1st)	Fancesa (2nd)
Tarija
Ciclón (1st)	García Agreda (2nd)
Pando
Real Vaca Díez (1st)	Universitario de Pando (2nd)
Beni
Primero de Mayo (1st)	Atlético Marbán (2nd)
Potosi
Nacional Potosí (1st)	Universitario de Potosi (2nd)
Oruro
31 de Octubre (1st)	Oruro Royal (2nd)

== Group stage ==
=== Group A ===
Serie A
Pos	Team	Pld	W	D	L	GF	GA	GD	Pts	Qualification
1	Enrique Happ	6	5	1	0	23	6	+17	16	Second Stage
2	31 de Octubre Huanuni	6	2	2	2	6	10	−4	8	
3	ABB	6	2	0	4	10	16	−6	6	

Source: Bolivia Acenso
Rules for classification: 1) points; 2) goal difference; 3) number of goals scored.

Serie B
Pos	Team	Pld	W	D	L	GF	GA	GD	Pts	Qualification
1	Oruro Royal	6	2	2	2	6	6	0	8	Second Stage
2	Bata	6	2	1	3	7	11	−4	7	
3	Mariscal Braun	6	1	2	3	6	9	−3	5	

Source: Bolivia Acenso
Rules for classification: 1) points; 2) goal difference; 3) number of goals scored.

Home \ Away	ORU	MBR	BAT	CEH	31H	ABB
Oruro Royal		2–0	0–3		0–0	
Mariscal Braun	1–1		0–0			3–2
Bata	0–2	1–0		3–6		
Enrique Happ			3–0		5–0	2–0
31 de Octubre Huanuni	2–1			1–1		2–0
ABB		2–3		2–6		

Updated to match(es) played on May 6, 2010. Source: RSSSF
Legend: Blue = home team win; Yellow = draw; Red = away team win.

=== Group B ===
Serie A
Pos	Team	Pld	W	D	L	GF	GA	GD	Pts	Qualification
1	García Agreda	6	4	2	0	10	5	+5	14	Second Stage
2	Universitario (Potosi)	6	2	0	4	7	11	−4	6	
3	Independiente Petrolero	6	0	1	5	3	12	−9	1	

Source: Soccer Way
Rules for classification: 1) points; 2) goal difference; 3) number of goals scored.

Serie B
Pos	Team	Pld	W	D	L	GF	GA	GD	Pts	Qualification
1	Nacional Potosí	6	4	2	0	10	4	+6	14	Second Stage
2	Fancesa	6	3	1	2	10	5	+5	10	
3	Ciclón	6	1	2	3	4	8	−4	5	

Source: Soccer Way
Rules for classification: 1) points; 2) goal difference; 3) number of goals scored.

Home \ Away	CGA	IPE	UNP	FAN	CAC	NAC
García Agreda		2–1	2–1		1–0	
Independiente Petrolero	1–1		1–2			
Universitario (Potosi)	1–3	3–0				0–1
Fancesa		3–0	1–0		4–1	0–1
Ciclón	1–1			1–0		1–1
Nacional Potosí			4–0	2–2	1–0	

Updated to match(es) played on May 6, 2010. Source: RSSSF
Legend: Blue = home team win; Yellow = draw; Red = away team win.

=== Group C ===
Pos	Team	Pld	W	D	L	GF	GA	GD	Pts	Qualification
1	Real America	6	5	0	1	19	5	+14	15	Second Stage
2	1º de Mayo	6	5	0	1	9	2	+7	15	Second Stage
3	Callejas	6	3	0	3	8	7	+1	9	
4	Atlético Marbán	6	2	1	3	7	10	−3	7	
5	Real Vaca Díez	6	1	1	4	4	16	−12	4	
6	Universitario (Pando)	6	1	0	5	2	9	−7	3	

Source: Soccer Way
Rules for classification: 1) points; 2) goal difference; 3) number of goals scored.

== Second stage ==
Team No. 1 played the second leg at home. The stage began on October 16 and ended on October 25.

Teams			Scores		Tie-breaker
Team No. 1	Points	Team No. 2	1st leg	2nd leg	Pen.
Nacional Potosi	3:3	1º de Mayo	2–4	6–0	3–4
Enrique Happ	1:4	García Agreda	0–1	0–0	–
Real America	3:3	Oruro Royal	0–2	3–1	3–0

First Leg

October 16, 2010
16:00

Oruro Royal	2 - 0	Real America
Uellington Martins 5'; Miguel Llusco 64'	Report

Estadio Jesús Bermúdez, Oruro
Attendance: 2,000

October 16, 2010
18:00

1º de Mayo	4 - 2	Nacional Potosi
Carlos Molina 18'; Mario Vargas 55'; Arturo Jiménez 64', 90'	Report	Alaín Saavedra 33', 45'

Estadio Lorgio Sanbrano, Trinidad
Attendance: 1,500

October 17, 2010
15:00

Enrique Happ	1 - 0	García Agreda
Aldo Gallardo 49'	Report

Estadio Felix Capriles, Cochabamba
Attendance: 4,000

Second Leg

October 24, 2010
18:00

Real America	3 - 1	Oruro Royal
Grover Cuéllar 64', 76', 78'	Report	Boris Chúa 77'

Estadio Ramón Tahuichi Aguilera, Santa Cruz de la Sierra

October 25, 2010
16:00

Enrique Happ	0 - 0	García Agreda
	Report

Estadio Felix Capriles, Cochabamba

October 25, 2010
18:00

Nacional Potosi	6 - 0	1º de Mayo
Martín Menacho 3'; Gaston Meaya 22'; Alain Saavedra 41', 65'; Carlos Camacho 45'; Miguel Turgez 80'	Report

Estadio Victor Agustín Ugarte, Potosi
Referee: 1,000

=== Semifinals ===
- Note that Nacional Potosi qualified as the best loser. Team No. 1 played the second leg at home.

Teams			Scores		Tie-breaker
Team No. 1	Points	Team No. 2	1st leg	2nd leg	Pen.
1º de Mayo	1:4	Nacional Potosi	1–2	2–2	–
García Agreda	1:4	Real America	1–3	1–1	–

First Leg

October 30, 2010
18:00

Real America	3 - 1	García Agreda
Rony Montero 21'; Gréver Cuéllar 25'; José Carlo Barba 43'	Report	Gerardo Castellón 77'

Estadio Ramón Tahuichi Aguilera, Santa Cruz de la Sierra
Attendance: 800

October 31, 2010
16:00

Nacional Potosi	2 - 1	1º de Mayo
Alahín Saavedra 5'; Gastón Mealla 68'	Report	Luis Martelli 81'

Estadio Victor Agustín Ugarte, Potosi

Second Leg

October 31, 2010
15:30

1º de Mayo	2 - 2	Nacional Potosi
Boris Montaño 29'; Eduardo Molina 60'	Report	Nicolás Canalis 37'; Arístides Núñez 75'

Estadio Gran Mamoré, Beni
Attendance: 3,000
Referee: Raul Orozco

October 31, 2010
15:30

Garcia Agreda	1 - 1	Real America
Jhon Tito 18'	Report	Roger Espinoza 87'

Estadio IV Centenário, Tarija
Attendance: 10,000
Referee: Peter Guerrero

=== Final ===
Teams			Scores		Tie-breaker
Team No. 1	Points	Team No. 2	1st leg	2nd leg	Playoff Match
Real America	0:6	Nacional Potosi	0–2	0–1	–

September 14, 2010
16:00

Nacional Potosi	2 - 0	Real America
Ricardo da Silva 72', 88'	Report

Estadio Victor Agustín Ugarte, Potosi
Attendance: 2,500
Referee: Raul Orozco

September 21, 2010
16:00

Real America	0 - 1	Nacional Potosi
	Report	Carlos Camacho 90'

Estadio Tahuichi Aguilera, Santa Cruz de la Sierra
Attendance: 1,000

2010 Copa Simon Bolivar
champion

2nd title
