= Cycling at the 2010 Summer Youth Olympics – Boys' time trial =

The Boys' time trial was part of the cycling at the 2010 Summer Youth Olympics program. The event consisted of one lap of cycling at a length of 3.2 kilometres (2.0 mi). It was held on 18 August 2010 at Tampines Bike Park. This was not an official individual event and therefore no medals were awarded. However, athletes' performances earned points towards the combined mixed-team cycling event.

== Results ==
The race began at approximately 10:00 a.m. (UTC+8) on 18 August at Tampines Bike Park.

Rank	Bib No.	Name	Final Time	Time Behind	Points
1	POR 3	Rafael Ferreira Reis (POR)	3:56.64	±0.00	1
2	AUS 3	Jay McCarthy (AUS)	3:59.63	+2.99	4
3	DEN 3	Michael Andersen (DEN)	4:00.40	+3.76	7
4	KAZ 3	Alexey Lutsenko (KAZ)	4:04.76	+8.12	10
5	COL 3	Brayan Ramírez (COL)	4:05.58	+8.94	12
6	BEL 3	Boris Vallee (BEL)	4:06.68	+10.04	14
7	ITA 3	Nicolas Marini (ITA)	4:08.62	+11.98	16
8	BLR 3	Kanstantsin Khviyuzau (BLR)	4:08.84	+12.20	18
9	CAN 3	Ryan Macdonald (CAN)	4:09.61	+12.97	20
10	POL 3	Marek Kulas (POL)	4:09.64	+13.00	22
11	NED 3	Friso Roscam Abbing Ijpeij (NED)	4:10.05	+13.41	24
12	NZL 3	Denay Cottam (NZL)	4:12.12	+15.48	25
13	ARG 3	Facundo Lezica (ARG)	4:12.27	+15.63	26
14	CHI 3	Edison Bravo Mansilla (CHI)	4:13.30	+16.66	27
15	JPN 3	Koji Nagase (JPN)	4:14.07	+17.43	28
16	ESP 3	Alvaro Trueba (ESP)	4:15.25	+18.61	29
17	CZE 3	Matej Lasak (CZE)	4:17.74	+21.10	30
18	MEX 3	Ulises Alfredo Castillo (MEX)	4:17.82	+21.18	30
19	SUI 3	Marc Schaerli (SUI)	4:19.00	+22.36	30
20	THA 3	Sarawut Sirironnachai (THA)	4:19.62	+22.98	30
21	RSA 3	Jayde Julius (RSA)	4:19.85	+23.21	30
22	SLO 3	Doron Hekic (SLO)	4:19.93	+23.29	30
23	INA 3	Ongky Setiawan (INA)	4:20.30	+23.66	30
24	BRA 3	Guilherme Pineyrua (BRA)	4:24.03	+27.39	30
25	SIN 3	Travis Joshua Woodford (SIN)	4:26.65	+30.01	30
26	ERI 3	Haben Ghebretinsae (ERI)	4:27.74	+31.10	30
27	CYP 3	Eirinaios Koutsiou (CYP)	4:29.15	+32.51	30
28	HUN 3	Ferenc Stuban (HUN)	4:31.31	+34.67	30
29	LAT 3	Aleksandrs Kurbatskis (LAT)	4:31.92	+35.28	30
30	SRB 3	Filip Pavlovic (SRB)	4:38.74	+42.10	30
31	ZIM 3	Tyron Mackie (ZIM)	4:57.99	+1:01.35	30
32	BOL 3	Samuel Melgar (BOL)	4:59.94	+1:03.30	30
