= Canoeing at the 2010 Summer Youth Olympics – Boys' K1 slalom =

These are the results of the Boys' K1 Slalom at the 2010 Summer Youth Olympics. It took place at the Marina Reservoir. Time Trial Round was on August 24, 2010. First elimination round, repechage and third round took place on August 24, and quarterfinals, semifinals and medals rounds were on August 25.

== Medalists ==
Gold	Simon Brus; Slovenia
Silver	Miroslav Urban; Slovakia
Bronze	Jiří Prskavec; Czech Republic

== Time Trial ==
Rank	Athlete	Time
1	Simon Brus (SLO)	1:25.57
2	Guillaume Bernis (FRA)	1:27.00
3	Miroslav Urban (SVK)	1:28.62
4	Jiří Prskavec (CZE)	1:29.76
5	Scott Smith (AUS)	1:31.80
6	Brandon Wei Cheng Ooi (SIN)	1:33.49
7	Andrew Martin (GBR)	1:35.74
8	Vasyl Zelnychenko (UKR)	1:36.28
9	Inigo Garcia (ESP)	1:39.03
10	Joao Paulo Barbosa da Silva (POR)	1:40.42
11	Ali Aghamirzaei (IRI)	1:41.01
12	Renier Mora Jimenez (CUB)	1:42.48
13	Sandor Totka (HUN)	1:43.60
14	Luke Stowman (RSA)	1:44.58
15	Igor Kalashnikov (RUS)	1:47.43
16	Andrei Tsarykovich (BLR)	1:49.24
17	Boris Nedyalkov (BUL)	1:49.52
18	Dipoko Dikongue (CMR)	1:50.43
19	Tom Liebscher (GER)	1:53.21
20	Wion Welh (LBR)	2:00.86
21	Igor Dolata (POL)	2:02.45
	Vanderley Cabral de Assuncao Silva (STP)	DNF
	Ruslan Moltaev (KGZ)	DSQ
	Elvis Sutkus (LTU)	DNS

== First round ==
The winners advanced to the 3rd round. Losers raced at the repechages.

Match 1

Name	Time
Guillaume Bernis (FRA)	1:30.89
Igor Dolata (POL)	2:03.80

Match 2

Name	Time
Miroslav Urban (SVK)	1:28.96
Wion Welh (LBR)	2:14.23

Match 3

Name	Time
Jiří Prskavec (CZE)	1:29.69
Tom Liebscher (GER)	1:40.32

Match 4

Name	Time
Scott Smith (AUS)	1:30.55
Dipoko Dikongue (CMR)	1:46.61

Match 5

Name	Time
Brandon Wei Cheng Ooi (SIN)	1:35.24
Boris Nedyalkov (BUL)	1:49.37

Match 6

Name	Time
Andrew Martin (GBR)	1:34.23
Andrei Tsarykovich (BLR)	1:43.89

Match 7

Name	Time
Vasyl Zelnychenko (UKR)	1:38.25
Igor Kalashnikov (RUS)	1:47.38

Match 8

Name	Time
Inigo Garcia (ESP)	1:38.08
Luke Stowman (RSA)	1:54.67

Match 9

Name	Time
Joao Paulo Barbosa da Silva (POR)	1:42.73
Sandor Totka (HUN)	1:45.40

Match 10

Name	Time
Ali Aghamirzaei (IRI)	1:39.13
Renier Mora Jimenez (CUB)	1:41.67

== Repechage ==
The fastest 5 boats advanced to the 3rd round.

Repechage 1

Name	Time
Tom Liebscher (GER)	1:39.82
Wion Welh (LBR)	2:11.71

Repechage 2

Name	Time
Renier Mora Jimenez (CUB)	1:46.40
Igor Dolata (POL)	1:53.42

Repechage 3

Name	Time
Luke Stowman (RSA)	1:42.91
Andrei Tsarykovich (BLR)	1:48.48

Repechage 4

Name	Time
Sandor Totka (HUN)	1:48.85
Boris Nedyalkov (BUL)	DNF

Repechage 5

Name	Time
Dipoko Dikongue (CMR)	1:51.10
Igor Kalashnikov (RUS)	DSQ

== Third round ==
The winners advanced to the quarterfinals.

Match 1

Name	Time
Simon Brus (SLO)	1:27.81
Sandor Totka (HUN)	1:43.38

Match 2

Name	Time
Miroslav Urban (SVK)	1:30.97
Andrei Tsarykovich (BLR)	1:46.62

Match 3

Name	Time
Jiří Prskavec (CZE)	1:29.58
Renier Mora Jimenez (CUB)	1:49.73

Match 4

Name	Time
Scott Smith (AUS)	1:31.65
Luke Stowman (RSA)	1:46.22

Match 5

Name	Time
Guillaume Bernis (FRA)	1:29.62
Joao Paulo Barbosa da Silva (POR)	1:41.11

Match 6

Name	Time
Andrew Martin (GBR)	1:36.96
Tom Liebscher (GER)	1:42.72

Match 7

Name	Time
Brandom Wei Cheng Ooi (SIN)	1:35.80
Ali Aghamirzaei (IRI)	1:43.21

Match 8

Name	Time
Vasyl Zelnychenko (UKR)	1:36.90
Inigo Garcia (ESP)	1:43.32

== Quarterfinals ==
The winners advanced to the semifinals.

Match 1

Name	Time
Simon Brus (SLO)	1:25.91
Andrew Martin (GBR)	1:35.40

Match 2

Name	Time
Jiří Prskavec (CZE)	1:29.19
Vasyl Zelnychenko (UKR)	1:39.04

Match 3

Name	Time
Guillaume Bernis (FRA)	1:28.68
Brandon Wei Cheng Ooi (SIN)	1:36.92

Match 4

Name	Time
Miroslav Urban (SVK)	1:28.02
Scott Smith (AUS)	1:35.57

== Semifinals ==
The winners advanced to the finals, losers advanced to the bronze medal match.

Match 1

Name	Time
Simon Brus (SLO)	1:25.44
Jiří Prskavec (CZE)	1:27.42

Match 2

Name	Time
Miroslav Urban (SVK)	1:27.42
Guillaume Bernis (FRA)	1:27.78

== Finals ==
Gold Medal Match

Rank	Name	Time
1st place, gold medalist(s)	Simon Brus (SLO)	1:25.15
2nd place, silver medalist(s)	Miroslav Urban (SVK)	1:30.24

Bronze Medal Match

Rank	Name	Time
3rd place, bronze medalist(s)	Jiří Prskavec (CZE)	1:28.23
4	Guillaume Bernis (FRA)	1:29.02
