= Cameroon at the 2010 Summer Youth Olympics =

- IOC code: CMR
- NOC: Cameroon Olympic and Sports Committee
- Website: http://www.cnosc.org/

in Singapore
- Competitors: 6 in 5 sports
- Flag bearer: Sophina Arrey
- Medals: Gold 0 Silver 0 Bronze 0 Total 0

Summer Youth Olympics appearances
- 2010; 2014; 2018

Cameroon competed at the 2010 Summer Youth Olympics, the inaugural Youth Olympic Games, held in Singapore from 14 August to 26 August 2010. The Cameroon team will consist of 6 athletes competing in 5 sports: Athletics, Canoeing, Judo, Swimming and Weightlifting.

== Athletics ==
=== Boys ===
Track and road events

| Athletes | Event | Qualification | | Final | |
| Athletes | Event | Result | Rank | Result | Rank |
|---|---|---|---|---|---|
| Romuald Adzaba Ngawessi | Boys' 100m | 11.36 | 18 qC | 11.43 | 17 |

== Canoeing ==
Boys

| Athlete | Event | Time Trial | | Round 1 | Round 2 (Rep) | Round 3 | Round 4 | Round 5 | Final |
| Athlete | Event | Time | Rank | Round 1 | Round 2 (Rep) | Round 3 | Round 4 | Round 5 | Final |
|---|---|---|---|---|---|---|---|---|---|
| Dikongue Dipoko | Boys’ K1 Slalom | 1:50.43 | 18 | Smith (AUS); L 1:46.61-1:30.55 | Kalashnikov (RUS); W 1:51.10-DSQ | Did not advance | | | |
| Dikongue Dipoko | Boys’ K1 Sprint | 3:18.67 | 23 | Tsarykovich (BLR); L 2:46.30-1:32.87 | Nedyalkov (BUL); L 2:39.13-1:37.66 | Did not advance | | | |

== Judo ==
Individual

| Athlete | Event | Round 1 | Round 2 | Round 3 | Semifinals | Final | Rank |
| Athlete | Event | Opposition Result | Opposition Result | Opposition Result | Opposition Result | Opposition Result | Rank |
|---|---|---|---|---|---|---|---|
| Sophina Arrey | Girls' -63 kg | BYE | Beridze (GEO); L 000-100 | Repechage; Kapeko (BOT); W 100-000 | Repechage; Matniyazova (UZB); L 000-110 | Did not advance | 9 |

Team

| Team | Event | Round 1 | Round 2 | Semifinals | Final | Rank |
| Team | Event | Opposition Result | Opposition Result | Opposition Result | Opposition Result | Rank |
|---|---|---|---|---|---|---|
| Paris; Barbara Batizi (HUN); Patrick Marxer (LIE); Maja Rasinska (POL); Farshid Ghasemi Asl (IRI); Sophina Arrey (CMR); Khasan Khalmurzaev (RUS); Sana Khelifi (ALG); Fernando Vanoye (MEX) | Mixed Team | Tokyo; L 3-5 | Did not advance | | | 9 |

== Swimming ==
| Athletes | Event | Heat | | Semifinal | | Final | |
| Athletes | Event | Time | Position | Time | Position | Time | Position |
|---|---|---|---|---|---|---|---|
| Landry Ndjemen Touka | Boys' 50m Freestyle | 37.53 | 47 | Did not advance | | | |
| Dahirou Zoubaydat | Girls' 50m Freestyle | 45.22 | 61 | Did not advance | | | |

== Weightlifting ==
| Athlete | Event | Snatch | Clean & jerk | Total | Rank |
|---|---|---|---|---|---|
| Myriam Ghekap | Girls' 58kg | 67 | 90 | 157 | 6 |
