= Iván Vargas =

Paraguayan footballer (born 1991)

Personal information
- Full name: Alexis Iván Vargas Artela
- Date of birth: 5 June 1991 (age 35)
- Place of birth: Guaraní, Paraguay
- Height: 1.84 m (6 ft 0 in)
- Position: Left midfielder

Team information
- Current team: Rubio Ñu

Youth career
- 2007–2009: Guaraní

Senior career*
Years	Team	Apps	(Gls)
2010–	Rubio Ñu	15	(4)

International career
2010	Paraguay U20	8	(3)
2011–	Paraguay	2	(0)
- * Club domestic league appearances and goals as of 3 February 2010

Iván Vargas (born 5 June 1991) is a Paraguayan football left midfielder. He currently plays for Club Rubio Ñu.

== International career ==
Vargas was one of the best players for the Paraguay national under-20 football team at the 2011 South American Youth Championship, where Paraguay finished in second place.
