= 2010 Bolivian Football Regional Leagues =

Primera A
- Season: 2010

This is the 101st season of Bolivian Football Regional Leagues also known as Primera A. In 2009 The team that was promoted to 1st division was Guabira from Santa Cruz after winning the 2009 Copa Simón Bolívar, and Ciclon came so close to be back in 1st division after Jorge Wilstermann suffered to win 3-2.

== Santa Cruz ==
Pos	Team	Pld	W	D	L	GF	GA	GD	Pts	Qualification
1	Torno F.C.	22	13	7	2	32	14	+18	46	Liguilla Final
2	Real Santa Cruz	22	11	9	2	33	19	+14	42	Liguilla Final
3	Real America	22	12	6	4	30	17	+13	42	Liguilla Final
4	Universidad de Santa Cruz	22	12	4	6	38	21	+17	40	Liguilla Final
5	Destroyers	22	11	3	8	47	28	+19	36	Liguilla Final
6	Club Callejas	22	11	3	8	34	33	+1	36	Liguilla Final
7	Oriente Petrolero	22	9	5	8	31	25	+6	32	Relegation Playoff
8	Libertad de Santa Cruz	22	5	9	8	35	43	−8	24	Relegation Playoff
9	Deportivo Warnes	22	5	8	9	27	32	−5	23	Relegation Playoff
10	Argentino Juniors	22	5	6	11	25	48	−23	21	Relegation Playoff
11	25 de Junio	22	1	9	12	18	37	−19	12	Relegation Playoff
12	24 de Septiembre	22	1	2	19	20	51	−31	5	Relegation Playoff

Updated to match(es) played on https://ascensobolivia.blogspot.com/. Source: Ascensobolivia.blogspot
Rules for classification: 1) points; 2) goal difference; 3) number of goals scored.

== Liguilla Final ==
Pos	Team	Pld	W	D	L	GF	GA	GD	Pts	Qualification
1	Real America	10	7	1	2	23	15	+8	22 (Note: Note that at the end of the season, Real America and Callejas would be awarded 2 points of bonification, Universidad and Torno F.C. would be awarded 1 point. More about Bolivian qualification: For further information on Bolivian qualification see Primera A qualification.)	2010 Copa Simón Bolívar
2	Callejas	10	6	2	2	21	11	+10	20	2010 Copa Simón Bolívar
3	Real Santa Cruz	10	4	5	1	11	9	+2	17	
4	Universidad de Santa Cruz	10	3	1	6	8	14	−6	10	
5	Destroyers	10	2	2	6	14	18	−4	8	
6	Torno F.C.	10	0	5	5	11	21	−10	5	

Source: Ascenso Bolivia
Rules for classification: 1) points; 2) goal difference; 3) number of goals scored.

== Relegation playoff ==
Pos	Team	Pld	W	D	L	GF	GA	GD	Pts	Relegation
1	Libertad de Santa Cruz	32	12	10	10	48	47	+1	46	
2	Argentino Juniors	32	12	6	14	42	56	−14	42	
3	Oriente Petrolero	32	10	7	15	37	42	−5	37	
4	Deportivo Warnes	32	8	10	14	41	47	−6	34	
5	25 de Junio	31	8	10	13	33	46	−13	34	Relegation to 2011 Primera B
6	24 de Septiembre	32	4	2	26	32	73	−41	14	Relegation to 2011 Primera B

Updated to match(es) played on https://ascensobolivia.blogspot.com/. Source: Ascensobolivia.blogspot
Rules for classification: 1) points; 2) goal difference; 3) number of goals scored.

== Tarija ==
Pos	Team	Pld	W	D	L	GF	GA	GD	Pts	Qualification or relegation
1	Ciclón	18	10	6	2	39	15	+24	36	2010 Copa Simón Bolívar
2	García Agreda	18	10	5	3	41	19	+22	35	2010 Copa Simón Bolívar
3	Atlético Bermejo	18	8	6	4	36	15	+21	30	
4	Union Tarija	18	7	7	4	34	14	+20	28	
5	Petrolero	18	5	5	8	28	17	+11	20	
6	Municipal Tarija	18	4	5	9	20	20	0	17	
7	San Luis de Tarija	18	4	4	10	17	21	−4	16	
8	Universitario de Tarija	18	2	5	11	15	25	−10	11	
9	Guadalquivir	18	2	4	12	16	33	−17	10	Relegation to 2011 Primera B
10	Independiente de Tarija	18	1	7	10	19	40	−21	10	Relegation to 2011 Primera B

Updated to match(es) played on https://ascensobolivia.blogspot.com/. Source: Ascensobolivia.blogspot
Rules for classification: 1) points; 2) goal difference; 3) number of goals scored.

== Oruro ==
Pos	Team	Pld	W	D	L	GF	GA	GD	Pts	Qualification or relegation
1	31 de Octubre Huanuni	20	12	2	6	43	23	+20	38	2010 Copa Simón Bolívar
2	Oruro Royal	20	11	1	8	45	34	+11	34	2010 Copa Simón Bolívar
3	Jóvenes Capaces de Triunfar	20	9	5	6	36	28	+8	32	
4	Frontanilla	20	9	5	6	37	36	+1	32	
5	Ingenieros	20	6	6	8	30	29	+1	24	
6	Deportivo Cristal	20	5	7	8	25	16	+9	22	
7	San José	20	4	10	6	20	14	+6	22	
8	Sabaya	20	4	7	9	17	23	−6	19	
9	Genaro Frontanilla	20	2	7	11	14	25	−11	13	
10	Atlético La Joya	20	1	4	15	13	28	−15	7	Relegation to 2011 Primera B
11	Litoral de Oruro	20	1	2	17	10	30	−20	5	Relegation to 2011 Primera B

Updated to match(es) played on https://ascensobolivia.blogspot.com/. Source: Ascensobolivia.blogspot
Rules for classification: 1) points; 2) goal difference; 3) number of goals scored.

== Cochabamba ==
Pos	Team	Pld	W	D	L	GF	GA	GD	Pts	Qualification or relegation
1	Escuela Happ	20	18	1	1	38	23	+15	55	2010 Copa Simón Bolívar
2	Bata	20	17	1	2	35	20	+15	52	2010 Copa Simón Bolívar
3	Universitario de Cochabamba	20	15	1	4	27	21	+6	46	
4	Aurora	20	13	5	2	22	11	+11	44	
5	Wilstermann	20	12	4	4	23	10	+13	40	
6	Nueva Cliza	20	10	0	10	21	19	+2	30	
7	Real Cochabamba	20	6	2	12	17	18	−1	20	
8	Arauco Prado	20	5	1	14	18	24	−6	16	
9	Cala Cala	20	2	4	14	14	26	−12	10	Relegation to 2011 Primera B
10	Racing de Cochabamba	20	2	3	15	11	29	−18	9	Relegation to 2011 Primera B

Updated to match(es) played on https://ascensobolivia.blogspot.com/. Source: Ascensobolivia.blogspot
Rules for classification: 1) points; 2) goal difference; 3) number of goals scored.

== La Paz ==
Pos	Team	Pld	W	D	L	GF	GA	GD	Pts	Qualification or relegation
1	Fraternidad Tigres	0	0	0	0	0	0	0	0	2010 Copa Simón Bolívar
2	Mariscal Braun	0	0	0	0	0	0	0	0	2010 Copa Simón Bolívar
3	EMI	0	0	0	0	0	0	0	0	
4	Union Maestranza	0	0	0	0	0	0	0	0	
5	Deportivo Zuraca	0	0	0	0	0	0	0	0	
6	31 de Octubre	0	0	0	0	0	0	0	0	
7	Cafetalero Caranavi	0	0	0	0	0	0	0	0	
8	ABB	0	0	0	0	0	0	0	0	
9	White Star F.C.	0	0	0	0	0	0	0	0	Relegation to 2011 Primera B
10	Ramiro Castillo	0	0	0	0	0	0	0	0	Relegation to 2011 Primera B

Updated to match(es) played on https://ascensobolivia.blogspot.com/. Source: Ascensobolivia.blogspot
Rules for classification: 1) points; 2) goal difference; 3) number of goals scored.

== Chuquisaca ==
Pos	Team	Pld	W	D	L	GF	GA	GD	Pts	Qualification or relegation
1	Independiente Petrolero	0	0	0	0	0	0	0	0	2010 Copa Simón Bolívar
2	Junín	0	0	0	0	0	0	0	0	2010 Copa Simón Bolívar
3	Alcalá	0	0	0	0	0	0	0	0	
4	Estudiantes La Plata	0	0	0	0	0	0	0	0	
5	Deportivo Alemán	0	0	0	0	0	0	0	0	
6	Figaro	0	0	0	0	0	0	0	0	
7	Fancesa	0	0	0	0	0	0	0	0	
8	Dunamis	0	0	0	0	0	0	0	0	
9	Stormers	0	0	0	0	0	0	0	0	Relegation to 2011 Primera B
10	Flamengo de Sucre	0	0	0	0	0	0	0	0	Relegation to 2011 Primera B

Updated to match(es) played on https://ascensobolivia.blogspot.com/. Source: Ascensobolivia.blogspot
Rules for classification: 1) points; 2) goal difference; 3) number of goals scored.

== Beni ==
Pos	Team	Pld	W	D	L	GF	GA	GD	Pts	Qualification or relegation
1	1º de Mayo	9	7	2	0	15	7	+8	23	2010 Copa Simón Bolívar
2	Pedro Marbán	4	3	1	0	11	5	+6	10	2010 Copa Simón Bolívar
3	Alianza Beni	0	0	0	0	0	0	0	0	
4	Villa Real Sociedad	0	0	0	0	0	0	0	0	
5	San Lorenzo	0	0	0	0	0	0	0	0	
6	Universitario (Beni)	0	0	0	0	0	0	0	0	
7	TBA	0	0	0	0	0	0	0	0	
8	TBA	0	0	0	0	0	0	0	0	
9	TBA	0	0	0	0	0	0	0	0	Relegation to 2011 Primera B
10	TBA	0	0	0	0	0	0	0	0	Relegation to 2011 Primera B

Updated to match(es) played on https://ascensobolivia.blogspot.com/. Source: Ascensobolivia.blogspot
Rules for classification: 1) points; 2) goal difference; 3) number of goals scored.

== Potosi ==
Pos	Team	Pld	W	D	L	GF	GA	GD	Pts	Qualification or relegation
1	Nacional Potosí	4	4	0	0	15	7	+8	12	2010 Copa Simón Bolívar
2	H. Players	4	3	1	0	11	5	+6	10	2010 Copa Simón Bolívar
3	10 de Noviembre	0	0	0	0	0	0	0	0	
4	Universitario (Potosi)	0	0	0	0	0	0	0	0	
5	Municipal Potosí	0	0	0	0	0	0	0	0	
6	Stormers San Lorenzo	0	0	0	0	0	0	0	0	
7	Interfi	0	0	0	0	0	0	0	0	Relegation to 2011 Primera B
8	Ferrocarril Palmeiras	0	0	0	0	0	0	0	0	Relegation to 2011 Primera B

Updated to match(es) played on https://ascensobolivia.blogspot.com/. Source: Ascensobolivia.blogspot
Rules for classification: 1) points; 2) goal difference; 3) number of goals scored.
