= Cristián Arano =

Bolivian footballer (born 1995)

Personal information
- Full name: Cristián Paul Arano Ruiz
- Date of birth: 23 February 1995 (age 31)
- Place of birth: Santa Cruz de la Sierra
- Height: 1.87 m (6 ft 2 in)
- Position: Midfielder

Team information
- Current team: Guabirá
- Number: 8

Senior career*
Years	Team	Apps	(Gls)
2014-16	Club Blooming	30	(1)
2016-17	Club Petrolero	20	(1)
2017-19	Club Blooming	85	(25)
2020-21	Jorge Wilstermann	24	(2)
2022	Club Blooming	31	(3)
2023	The Strongest	5	(0)
2024	Real Tomayapo	19	(3)
2025-	Guabirá	9	(1)

International career
2018-	Bolivia	10	(0)
- * Club domestic league appearances and goals as of 30 December 2025

Cristián Paul Arano Ruiz (born 23 February 1995) is a Bolivian footballer who plays for Club Deportivo Guabirá in the Bolivian Primera División. He is a Bolivian international.

== Career ==
Arano made his first division debut for Club Blooming in a 3–0 home victory over Nacional Potosí on March 13, 2014. He scored his first goal with Blooming on August 9, 2015, in a 1–1 draw against The Strongest at Estadio Hernando Siles.

== International career ==
Arano made his full international debut for the Bolivia national football team on the 13 October 2018 against Myanmar a 3–0 victory at the Thuwanna YTC Stadium.
