= Natalia Rak =

Natalia Rak (or just Rak; born 1986) is a Polish street artist. She uses brightly colored paint to do multistory murals on the sides of buildings around Poland and Internationally. Originally painting canvases, she switched to street art.

== Education ==
Natalia Rak is a graduate of Art High School in Radom. She studied Fine Art at the University of Łódź, Poland, focusing mainly in Graphic Design.

== History ==
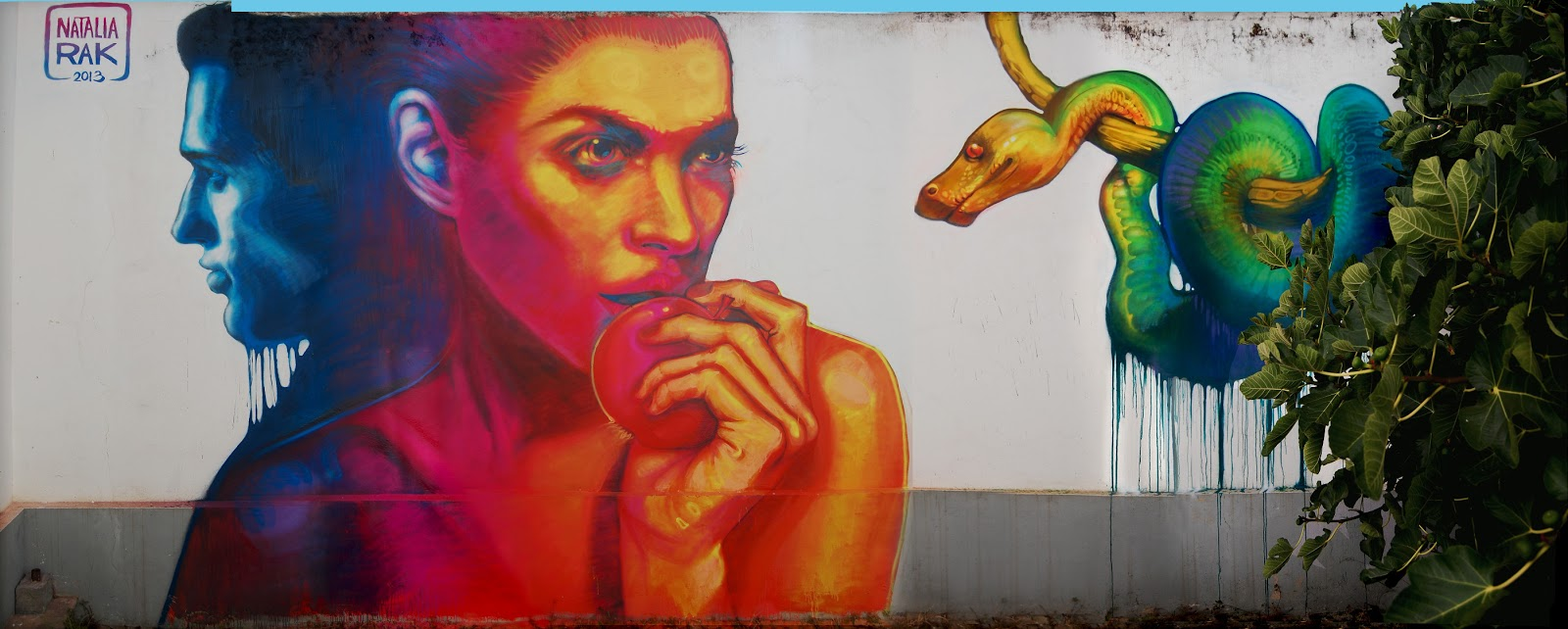
Adam and Eve

Natalia Rak's subjects are typically murals of one or two individuals, mostly women. Her larger than life paintings try to invoke mystery and metaphor, often using classic stories like Adam and Eve and Romeo and Juliet. The artist uses a palette of bright colours in many of her realistic murals.

Rak started showing her work in street art exhibitions in 2009 in Łódź. A year later she participated in a show called "Different histories, join futures" in Zgorzelec. In Greater Poland at the SCABB festival, she painted a mural that was filmed by CNN. Coming back in 2012 and in 2013 to contribute to the show. Also in 2012 she made an appearance at the Stroke Art Fair in Berlin, Germany

In 2013 she went to the US and participated in "Art Battles" in New York City. At 5 Bryant Street she helped convert an unused space into an exhibition of sorts of street art. There she collaborated with Don Rimx's ideas to create a mural.

Since 2014, the artist has painted murals in various cities worldwide, including Dunedin, New Zealand, Ragusa, Italy, Providence, Rhode Island (US), Berlin (Germany), Napa, California (US), and Port Adelaide (Australia).
