= Alessia Bulleri =

Italian racing cyclist (born 1993)

Personal information
- Full name: Alessia Bulleri
- Born: 19 July 1993 (age 33)

Cycling career
- Sport: Cycling
- Current team: Eneicat–CMTeam (road); Cycling Café Racing Team (cyclo-cross)
- Disciplines: Road; Cyclo-cross
- Role: Rider

Professional teams
- 2016–2018: Aromitalia Vaiano
- 2019–: Eneicat
- 2020–: Cycling Café Racing Team (cyclo-cross)

Alessia Bulleri (born 19 July 1993) is an Italian road and cyclo-cross cyclist, who currently rides for UCI Women's Continental Team Eneicat–CMTeam in road cycling, and UCI Cyclo-cross Team Cycling Café Racing Team in cyclo-cross. She represented her nation in the women's elite event at the 2016 UCI Cyclo-cross World Championships in Heusden-Zolder.
