= Rimma Luchshenko =

Kazakhstani cyclist

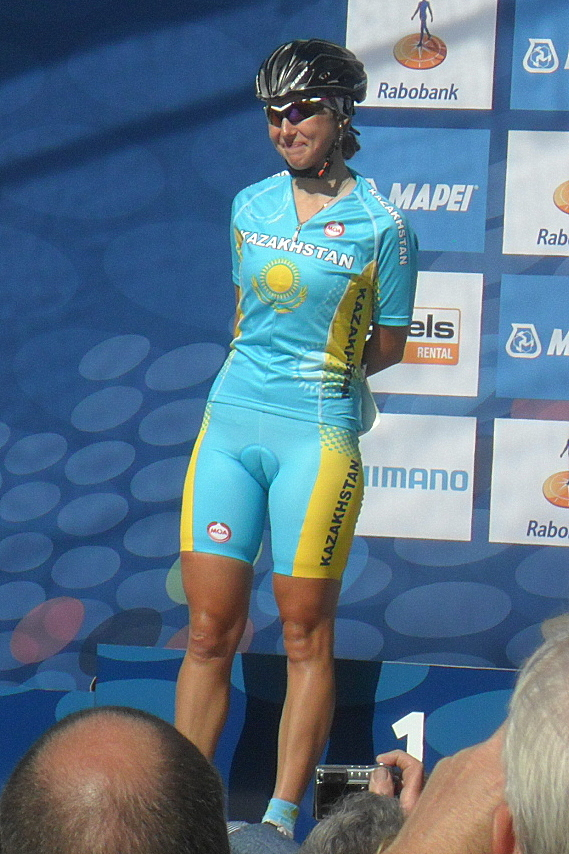
- Rimma Luchshenko at the 2012 UCI Road World Championships

Personal information
- Born: 29 April 1993 (age 33) Kazakhstan

Cycling career
- Sport: Cycling
- Discipline: Road cycling

Professional team
- 2012: BePink(trainee)

Rimma Luchshenko (born 29 April 1993) is a road cyclist from Kazakhstan.

She participated at the 2012 UCI Road World Championships, in the Italian team Be Pink.
