= Monika Żur =

Polish cyclist (born 1993)

Personal information
- Born: 22 April 1993 (age 33)

Cycling career
- Sport: Cycling
- Role: Rider

Monika Żur (born 22 April 1993) is a Polish professional racing cyclist. She rode in the women's road race at the 2015 UCI Road World Championships.
