= Jovana Crnogorac =

Serbian cross-country mountain biker

Personal information
- Full name: Jovana Crnogorac
- Born: 29 February 1992 (age 34) Belgrade, SR Serbia, SFR Yugoslavia

Cycling career
- Sport: Cycling
- Discipline: Mountain bike
- Role: Rider
- Rider type: Cross-country

Professional team
- Salcano

Jovana Crnogorac (born 29 February 1992 in Belgrade) is a Serbian cross-country mountain biker. She competes for Turkey team Salcano. She competed at the 2010 Youth Olympics in Singapore. At the 2014 Mountain Bike U23 World Championship she won 5th place and finished 5th in overall standings of the 2014 U23 UCI Mountain Bike World Cup.

== Achievements ==
- World U23 Championship:
  - 5th place, Hafjell 2014
  - 18th place, Pietermaritzburg 2013
  - 14th place, Saalfelden 2012
- European U23 Championship:
  - 8th place, St. Wendel 2014
  - 14th place, Bern 2013
  - 15th place, Moscow 2012
- World Cup:
  - 3rd place - U23 Windham 2014
  - 3rd place - U23 Cairns 2014
  - 4th place - U23 Albstad 2014
  - 6th place - U23 Pietermaritzburg 2014
  - 13th place - U23 Hafjell 2013
  - 9th place - U23 Andorra 2013
  - 12th place - U23 Val di Sole 2013
- European Games:
  - 19th place, Baku 2015
