= Hossam Salah Eldeen =

Egyptian sport shooter

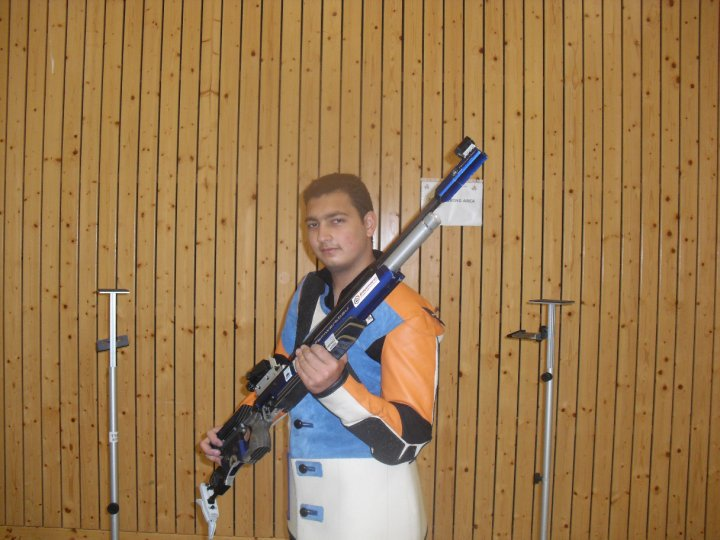

Personal information
- Nationality: Egyptian
- Born: June 1, 1992 (age 32); Cairo, Egypt
- Weight: 85 kg (187 lb)

Sport
- Sport: Shooting
- Event: 10m air rifle
- Club: El Shams Club

Hossam Salah Eldeen (born June 1, 1992) is an Olympic shooter from Egypt.

He started shooting in 2006; his family soon realised his talent and after one year of training he placed third in his first national championship in 2007. Since then he won several titles and joined the national team, under head coach Mohammed Amer.

== Shooting career ==
Eldeen ruled the African Youth Qualification Championships in Algeria, 2010, scoring 591 points out of 600 and getting a quota for the first Summer Youth Olympics held in Singapore. He also ranked fourth in pre-Olympic shooting competition in Singapore that same year.

The only African shooter in the Youth Olympic Games, Hossam Salah Eldeen was poised to cause an upset. He had shown consistency during practice sessions since arriving in Singapore, but ending up scoring only 580 points out of 600.
