= 2010 BWF World Junior Championships – boys' singles =

2010 BWF World Junior Championships boys' Singles
Tournament details
- Dates: 21 April 2010 – 25 April 2010
- Edition: 12th
- Level: International
- Venue: CODE Dome
- Location: Guadalajara, Mexico

The boys' singles event for the 2010 BWF World Junior Championships was held between 21 April and 25 April. Viktor Axelsen became the first non-Asian to win the singles title.

== Seeded ==
1. (China) Huang Yuxiang (quarter-final)
2. (Malaysia) Loh Wei Sheng (third round)
3. (Malaysia) Zulfadli Zulkiffli (fourth round)
4. (Thailand) Pisit Poodchalat (quarter-final)
5. (China) Cai Ruiqing (second round)
6. (Denmark) Viktor Axelsen (champion)
7. (Finland) Kasper Lehikoinen (second round)
8. (India) Sai Praneeth (semi-final)
9. (Japan) Kento Horiuchi (fourth round)
10. (South Korea) Kim Min-Ki (third round)
11. (France) Lucas Claerbout (fourth round)
12. (Indonesia) Riyanto Subagja (quarter-final)
13. (Denmark) Flemming Quach (third round)
14. (England) Toby Penty (second round)
15. (China) Liu Kai (quarter-final)
16. (Chinese Taipei) Hsieh Feng-Tse (fourth round)

== Draw ==
=== Finals ===
Quarterfinals
1	(China) Huang Yuxiang	12	21	16
5/8	(Denmark) Viktor Axelsen	21	11	21
9/16	(Indonesia) Riyanto Subagja	14	10
5/8	(India) Sai Praneeth	21	21
(South Korea) Kang Ji-Wook	21	21
3/4	(Thailand) Pisit Poodchalat	8	17
9/16	(China) Liu Kai	21	19	15
(India) Prannoy Kumar	17	21	21

Semifinals
5/8	(Denmark) Viktor Axelsen	19	21	21
5/8	(India) Sai Praneeth	21	15	15
(South Korea) Kang Ji-Wook	21	21
(India) Prannoy Kumar	13	9

Final
5/8	(Denmark) Viktor Axelsen	21	21
(South Korea) Kang Ji-Wook	19	10

=== Top half ===
==== Section 1 ====
First round
(Netherlands) N Fransman
(Algeria) M Belarbi	WO
(Thailand) N Chokdiphanit	21	21	21
(Sri Lanka) D Kariyawasam	16	23	16
(South Africa) P Vijayanath	21	11	21
(Mexico) L Trejo	19	21	12
(United States) B Lum	12	21	12
(Canada) H Pan	21	18	21

Second round
1	(China) Huang YX	21	21
(Germany) P Lang	18	15
(Netherlands) N Fransman	21	21
(Thailand) N Chokdiphanit	14	16
9/16	(Japan) K Horiuchi	21	21
(England) J Green	14	17
(South Africa) P Vijayanath	18	14
(Canada) H Pan	21	21

Third round
1	(China) Huang YX	21	21
(Netherlands) N Fransman	20	11
9/16	(Japan) K Horiuchi	21	21
(Canada) H Pan	14	11

Fourth round
1	(China) Huang YX	16	21	21
9/16	(Japan) K Horiuchi	21	16	11

==== Section 2 ====
First round
(Suriname) I Djabar	11	12
(Singapore) Ngo YC	21	21
(Ecuador) S Teran	18	23	15
(South Africa) J McManus	21	21	21
(Turkey) E Vural	21	21
(Brazil) I Ibrahim	9	8
(Brazil) L dos Santos	15	11
(Austria) V Vattanirappel	21	21
(Sri Lanka) S Mudiyaselage	8	10
(Hong Kong) Ng KL	21	21

Second round
5/8	(Denmark) V Axelsen	21	21
(Guatemala) A Marroquin	8	7
(Singapore) Ngo YC	21	21
(South Africa) J McManus	9	13
9/16	(South Korea) Kim M-K	21	27
(Turkey) E Vural	10	25
(Austria) V Vattanirappel	18	5
(Hong Kong) Ng KL	21	21

Third round
5/8	(Denmark) V Axelsen	21	21
(Singapore) Ngo YC	13	9
9/16	(South Korea) Kim M-K	17	21	9
(Hong Kong) Ng KL	21	10	21

Fourth round
5/8	(Denmark) V Axelsen	21	21
(Hong Kong) Ng KL	16	19

==== Section 3 ====
First round
(Peru) M Cuba	17	14
(Japan) K Momota	21	21
(Mexico) J Castillo	16	16
(Turkey) R Ozturk	21	21
(Singapore) Huang C	21	21
(Puerto Rico) A Roman	18	14
(United States) Z Lam	21	21
(Puerto Rico) A Aviles	7	9

Second round
3/4	(Malaysia) Z Zulkiffli	21	21
(China) Liu H	17	12
(Japan) K Momota	15	21	21
(Turkey) R Ozturk	21	11	16
9/16	(Indonesia) R Subagja	21	21
(Singapore) Tan KH	11	12
(Singapore) Huang C	21	21
(United States) Z Lam	17	11

Third round
3/4	(Malaysia) Z Zulkiffli	20	21	21
(Japan) K Momota	22	19	5
9/16	(Indonesia) R Subagja	21	21
(Singapore) Huang C	15	16

Fourth round
3/4	(Malaysia) Z Zulkiffli	19	22	18
9/16	(Indonesia) R Subagja	21	20	21

==== Section 4 ====
First round
(Russia) D Grachev	21	21
(Germany) K Schaefer	19	16
(Germany) R Beck	17	13
(Thailand) B Thumpanichwong	21	21
(Japan) H Takeuchi	21	21
(Thailand) P Thongnuam	19	19
(Chinese Taipei) Hsieh P-H	21	21
(Peru) P Aguilar	8	14
(Jamaica) A McNee	12	16
(Canada) N Yakura	21	21

Second round
5/8	(India) S Praneeth	21	21
(Guatemala) H Humblers	11	6
(Russia) D Grachev	16	18
(Thailand) B Thumpanichwong	21	21
9/16	(France) L Claerbout	21	21
(Japan) H Takeuchi	12	17
(Chinese Taipei) Hsieh P-H	21	21
(Canada) N Yakura	9	16

Third round
5/8	(India) S Praneeth	21	21
(Thailand) B Thumpanichwong	10	8
9/16	(France) L Claerbout	21	21
(Chinese Taipei) Hsieh P-H	18	9

Fourth round
5/8	(India) S Praneeth	21	21
9/16	(France) L Claerbout	13	12

=== Bottom half ===
==== Section 5 ====
First round
(Malaysia) Tew GC	22	16	21
(Canada) S Shatenko	20	21	18
(Singapore) Koh JY	16	7
(Denmark) R Fladberg	21	21
(South Korea) Kang J-W	21	21
(Mexico) A Lopez	13	13
(South Africa) A Malan	21	21
(United States) Chan YH	18	15
(England) S Dobson	21	21
(Suriname) D Darmohoetomo	14	16

Second round
(Malaysia) Tew GC	15	18
(Denmark) R Fladberg	21	21
(South Korea) Kang J-W	21	21
9/16	(England) T Penty	12	18
(South Africa) A Malan	20	9
(England) S Dobson	22	21
(Turkey) E Lale	21	21
5/8	(Finland) K Lehikoinen	12	15

Third round
(Denmark) R Fladberg	21	15	15
(South Korea) Kang J-W	10	21	21
(England) S Dobson	9	11
(Turkey) E Lale	21	21

Fourth round
(South Korea) Kang J-W	24	21
(Turkey) E Lale	22	16

==== Section 6 ====
First round
(Guatemala) J Solis
(Puerto Rico) F Jimenez	WO
(Puerto Rico) H Torres	0	8
(Denmark) M Brodbaek	21	21
(Dominican Republic) W Cabrera	15	13
(Netherlands) J Middleburg	21	21
(Austria) D Trojan	12	16
(Hong Kong) Tam CH	21	21
(Russia) K Abramov	17	9
(Japan) S Hoshino	21	21

Second round
(Guatemala) J Solis	13	4
(Denmark) M Brodbaek	21	21
(Netherlands) J Middleburg	12	16
9/16	(Denmark) F Quach	21	21
(Hong Kong) Tam CH	14	10
(Japan) S Hoshino	21	21
(Algeria) A Hamek	WO
3/4	(Thailand) P Poodchalat

Third round
(Denmark) M Brodbaek	21	21
9/16	(Denmark) F Quach	19	9
(Japan) S Hoshino	18	19
3/4	(Thailand) P Poodchalat	21	21

Fourth round
(Denmark) M Brodbaek	21	14	9
3/4	(Thailand) P Poodchalat	19	21	21

==== Section 7 ====
First round
(Peru) I De Vinatea	21	21
(Brazil) T Mantovani	16	10
(South Africa) J Mortimer	19	21	21
(Peru) G Duany	21	13	16
(South Korea) Lee H-J	21	7	15
(France) L Corvee	14	21	21
(Canada) A Harrison	21	21
(Sri Lanka) M Ranasinghe	16	19
(Mexico) A Sanchez	7	9
(Germany) M Schwenger	21	21

Second round
(Peru) I De Vinatea	21	21
(South Africa) J Mortimer	8	12
(France) L Corvee	16	21	19
9/16	(China) Liu K	21	17	21
(Canada) A Harrison	15	13
(Germany) M Schwenger	21	21
(South Korea) Ha Y-W	23	21
5/8	(China) Cai RQ	21	17

Third round
(Peru) I De Vinatea	6	12
9/16	(China) Liu K	21	21
(Germany) M Schwenger	7	10
(South Korea) Ha Y-W	21	21

Fourth round
9/16	(China) Liu K	21	22
(South Korea) Ha Y-W	12	20

==== Section 8 ====
First round
(Indonesia) S Rhustavito	21	21
(Malaysia) N Ayub	11	19
(Russia) A Yartsev	13	24	14
(Hong Kong) Lee CH	21	22	21
(India) P Kumar	21	21
(United States) M Lin	5	12
(Austria) M Almer	21	21
(Sri Lanka) C Kukulage	16	7

Second round
(Indonesia) S Rhustavito	7	26	18
(Hong Kong) Lee CH	21	24	21
(England) C Coles	13	8
9/16	(Chinese Taipei) Hsieh F-T	21	21
(India) P Kumar	21	21
(Austria) M Almer	17	8
(Jamaica) D Coke	10	11
2	(Malaysia) Loh WS	21	21

Third round
(Hong Kong) Lee CH	13	19
9/16	(Chinese Taipei) Hsieh F-T	21	21
(India) P Kumar	21	21
2	(Malaysia) Loh WS	16	19

Fourth round
9/16	(Chinese Taipei) Hsieh F-T	9	9
(India) P Kumar	21	21
