= Badminton at the 2010 Summer Youth Olympics – Boys' singles =

Boys' singles at the I Summer Youth Olympic Games
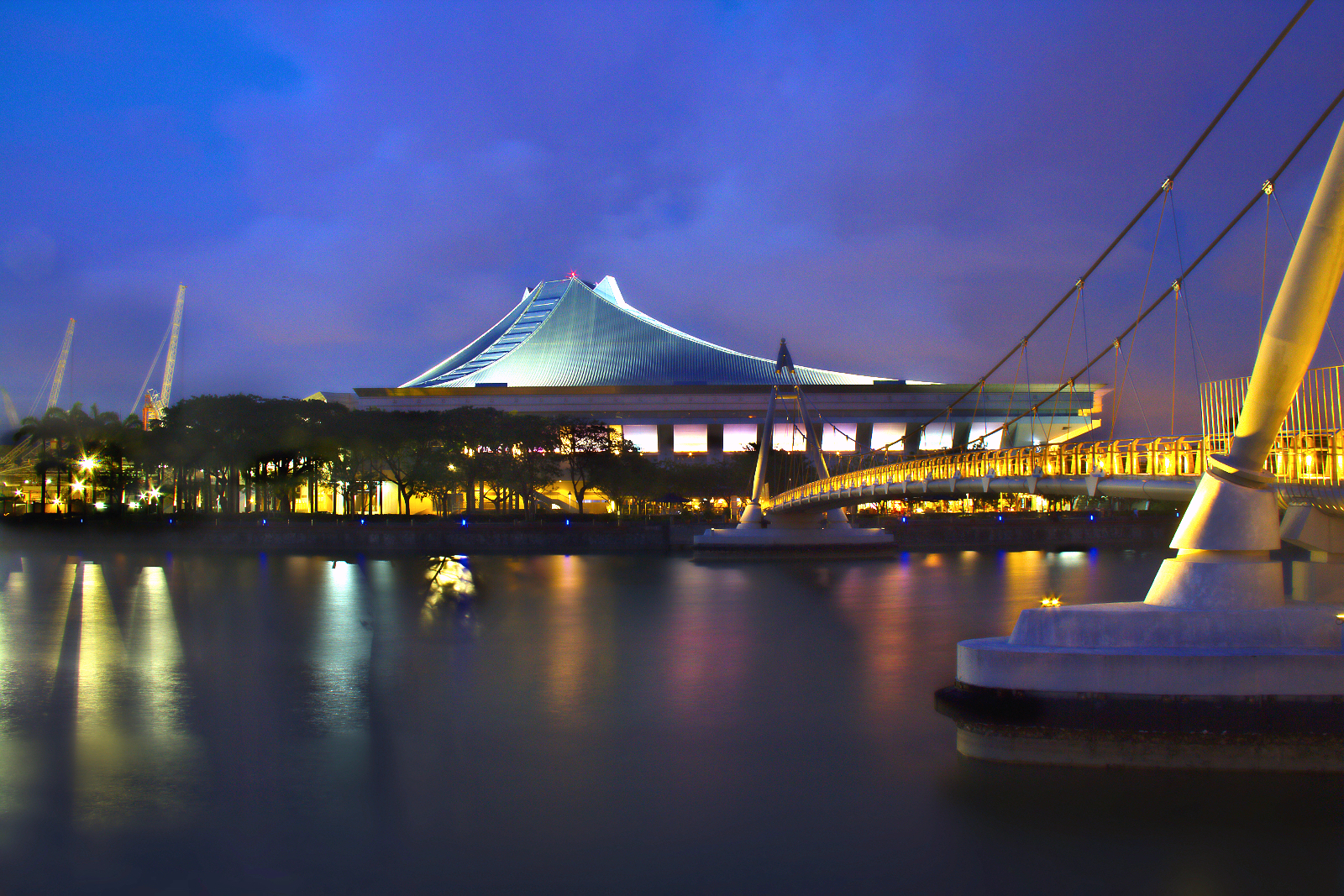
- Exterior view of the Singapore Indoor Stadium, where the boys' singles badminton tournament was held.
- Venue: Singapore Indoor Stadium
- Dates: 15 – 19 August 2010
- Competitors: 32 from 30 nations

Medalists
1st place, gold medalist(s)		Pisit Poodchalat	Thailand
2nd place, silver medalist(s)		Prannoy Kumar	India
3rd place, bronze medalist(s)		Kang Ji-wook	South Korea

These are the results of the boys' singles badminton event at the 2010 Summer Youth Olympics. The 32 qualified athletes were split into 8 groups, with four players each. In their groups, they play a one-way round-robin and the first of each group qualifies to the quarterfinals, where they play a knock-out stage until the medal matches.

Badminton was staged at the Singapore Indoor Stadium.

== Group play ==
=== Groups ===
Group A		Group B		Group C		Group D	
Seed	Athlete	Seed	Athlete	Seed	Athlete	Seed	Athlete
1; 18; 31; 21	Kang Ji-wook (KOR) Zenas Lam (USA); Ngosa Chongo (ZAM); Job Castillo (MEX)	6; 29; 17; 9	Kento Horiuchi (JPN) Irfan Djabar (SUR); Henry Pan (CAN); Evert Sukamta (INA)	3; 27; 19; 13	Prannoy Kumar (IND) Phetphanom Keophiachan (LAO); Dennis Coke (JAM); Lucas Claerbout (FRA)	8; 11; 10; 22	Kasper Lehikoinen (FIN) Dilshan Kariyawasam (SRI); Hsieh Feng-tse (TPE); Boris Ma (AUS)
Group E		Group F		Group G		Group H	
Seed	Athlete	Seed	Athlete	Seed	Athlete	Seed	Athlete
5; 14; 12; 26	Pisit Poodchalat (THA) Mikael Westerbäck (SWE); Flemming Quach (DEN); Mohammed Qaddoum (JOR)	4; 24; 15; 25	Huang Yuxiang (CHN) Mohamed Abderahim Belarbi (ALG); Nick Fransman (NED); Mahmoud El Sayad (EGY)	7; 30; 16; 28	Loh Wei Sheng (MAS) Nguyễn Huỳnh Thông Thạo (VIE); Emre Lale (TUR); Kervin Ghislain (SEY)	2; 20; 23; 32	B. Sai Praneeth (IND) Mario Cuba (PER); Asher Richardson (NZL); Huang Chao (SIN)

=== Results ===
Key to colours in group tables
Player advancing to knockout stage

==== Group A ====
Athlete	Matches			Sets			Points		
Athlete	W	L	Tot	W	L	Diff	W	L	Diff
Kang Ji-wook (KOR)	3	0	3	6	0	+6	84	45	+39
Job Castillo (MEX)	2	1	3	4	2	+2	71	69	+2
Zenas Lam (USA)	1	2	3	2	4	-2	69	71	–2
Ngosa Chongo (ZAM)	0	3	3	0	6	–6	45	84	–39

Sunday, 15 August
09:00
Kang Ji-wook (KOR)	2-0	Job Castillo (MEX)	21–12, 21–17	22min	Court 1
10:45
Zenas Lam (USA)	2-0	Ngosa Chongo (ZAM)	21–15, 21–14	18min	Court 2
18:30
Kang Ji-wook (KOR)	2-0	Ngosa Chongo (ZAM)	21–7, 21–9	18min	Court 2
20:15
Zenas Lam (USA)	0-2	Job Castillo (MEX)	18–21, 9–21	25min	Court 1
Monday, 16 August
13:30
Kang Ji-wook (KOR)	2-0	Zenas Lam (USA)	21-16, 21-9	15min	Court 1
15:15
Ngosa Chongo (ZAM)	0-2	Job Castillo (MEX)	14-21, 10-21	23min	Court 1

==== Group B ====
Athlete	Matches			Sets			Points		
Athlete	W	L	Tot	W	L	Diff	W	L	Diff
Evert Sukamta (INA)	3	0	3	6	1	+5	140	85	+55
Kento Horiuchi (JPN)	2	1	3	5	2	+3	125	110	+15
Henry Pan (CAN)	1	2	3	2	5	–3	114	142	–28
Irfan Djabar (SUR)	0	3	3	1	6	–5	98	140	–42

Sunday, 15 August
09:50
Kento Horiuchi (JPN)	1-2	Evert Sukamta (INA)	7–21, 21–14, 13–21	40min	Court 2
11:15
Irfan Djabar (SUR)	1-2	Henry Pan (CAN)	21–12, 21–23, 16–21	32min	Court 3
19:05
Kento Horiuchi (JPN)	2-0	Henry Pan (CAN)	21–18, 21–10	22min	Court 1
20:45
Irfan Djabar (SUR)	0-2	Evert Sukamta (INA)	4–21, 10–21	17min	Court 3
Monday, 16 August
14:05
Kento Horiuchi (JPN)	2-0	Irfan Djabar (SUR)	21-11, 21-15	19min	Court 1
14:55
Henry Pan (CAN)	0-2	Evert Sukamta (INA)	17-21, 13-21	25min	Court 2

==== Group C ====
Athlete	Matches			Sets			Points		
Athlete	W	L	Tot	W	L	Diff	W	L	Diff
Prannoy Kumar (IND)	3	0	3	6	0	+6	126	71	+55
Lucas Claerbout (FRA)	2	1	3	4	2	+2	113	74	+39
Phetphanom Keophiachan (LAO)	1	2	3	2	4	-2	85	111	–26
Dennis Coke (JAM)	0	3	3	0	6	–6	58	126	–68

Sunday, 15 August
11:00
Prannoy Kumar (IND)	2-0	Lucas Claerbout (FRA)	21–15, 21–14	25min	Court 2
11:50
Phetphanom Keophiachan (LAO)	2-0	Dennis Coke (JAM)	21–16, 21–11	24min	Court 3
19:35
Prannoy Kumar (IND)	2-0	Dennis Coke (JAM)	21–9, 21–10	25min	Court 3
19:40
Phetphanom Keophiachan (LAO)	0-2	Lucas Claerbout (FRA)	12–21, 8–21	25min	Court 1
Monday, 16 August
14:35
Prannoy Kumar (IND)	2-0	Phetphanom Keophiachan (LAO)	21-11, 21-12	19min	Court 3
15:45
Dennis Coke (JAM)	0-2	Lucas Claerbout (FRA)	6-21, 6-21	19min	Court 3

==== Group D ====
Athlete	Matches			Sets			Points		
Athlete	W	L	Tot	W	L	Diff	W	L	Diff
Hsieh Feng-tse (TPE)	3	0	3	6	0	+6	126	71	+55
Kasper Lehikoinen (FIN)	2	1	3	4	2	+2	112	77	+35
Dilshan Kariyawasam (SRI)	1	2	3	2	4	-2	94	103	-9
Boris Ma (AUS)	0	3	3	0	6	–6	45	126	–81

Sunday, 15 August
10:05
Kasper Lehikoinen (FIN)	2-0	Boris Ma (AUS)	21–4, 21–5	15min	Court 3
12:10
Dilshan Kariyawasam (SRI)	0-2	Hsieh Feng-tse (TPE)	12–21, 14–21	22min	Court 2
19:55
Kasper Lehikoinen (FIN)	0-2	Hsieh Feng-tse (TPE)	14–21, 14–21	36min	Court 2
21:40
Dilshan Kariyawasam (SRI)	2-0	Boris Ma (AUS)	21–14, 21–5	23min	Court 2
Monday, 16 August
14:40
Kasper Lehikoinen (FIN)	2-0	Dilshan Kariyawasam (SRI)	21-8, 21-18	30min	Court 1
16:40
Hsieh Feng-tse (TPE)	2-0	Boris Ma (AUS)	21-5, 21-12	20min	Court 2

==== Group E ====
Athlete	Matches			Sets			Points		
Athlete	W	L	Tot	W	L	Diff	W	L	Diff
Pisit Poodchalat (THA)	3	0	3	6	0	+6	126	66	+60
Flemming Quach (DEN)	2	1	3	4	2	+2	118	92	+26
Mikael Westerbäck (SWE)	1	2	3	2	4	–2	95	98	–3
Mohammed Qaddoum (JOR)	0	3	3	0	6	–6	43	126	–83

Sunday, 15 August
14:00
Pisit Poodchalat (THA)	2-0	Mohammed Qaddoum (JOR)	21–3, 21–6	18min	Court 3
15:30
Mikael Westerbäck (SWE)	0-2	Flemming Quach (DEN)	20–22, 9–21	28min	Court 2
Monday, 16 August
9:00
Pisit Poodchalat (THA)	2-0	Flemming Quach (DEN)	21-18, 21-15	40min	Court 2
10:45
Mikael Westerbäck (SWE)	2-0	Mohammed Qaddoum (JOR)	21-4, 21-9	17min	Court 1
18:30
Pisit Poodchalat (THA)	2-0	Mikael Westerbäck (SWE)	21-13, 21-11	25min	Court 2
20:15
Flemming Quach (DEN)	2-0	Mohammed Qaddoum (JOR)	21-8, 21-13	21min	Court 1

==== Group F ====
Athlete	Matches			Sets			Points		
Athlete	W	L	Tot	W	L	Diff	W	L	Diff
Huang Yuxiang (CHN)	3	0	3	6	0	+6	126	67	+59
Mahmoud El Sayad (EGY)	2	1	3	4	2	+2	107	113	–6
Nick Fransman (NED)	1	2	3	2	4	-2	102	114	-12
Mohamed Abderahim Belarbi (ALG)	0	3	3	0	6	–6	86	127	–41

Sunday, 15 August
14:05
Huang Yuxiang (CHN)	2-0	Mahmoud El Sayad (EGY)	21–9, 21–13	18min	Court 1
15:45
Mohamed Abderahim Belarbi (ALG)	0-2	Nick Fransman (NED)	14–21, 16–21	18min	Court 3
Monday, 16 August
9:50
Huang Yuxiang (CHN)	2-0	Nick Fransman (NED)	21-11, 21-14	24min	Court 2
11:15
Mohamed Abderahim Belarbi (ALG)	0-2	Mahmoud El Sayad (EGY)	16-21, 20-22	25min	Court 3
19:05
Huang Yuxiang (CHN)	2-0	Mohamed Abderahim Belarbi (ALG)	21-9, 21-11	20min	Court 1
20:45
Nick Fransman (NED)	0-2	Mahmoud El Sayad (EGY)	16-21, 19-21	25min	Court 3

==== Group G ====
Athlete	Matches			Sets			Points		
Athlete	W	L	Tot	W	L	Diff	W	L	Diff
Loh Wei Sheng (MAS)	3	0	3	6	0	+6	126	57	+69
Emre Lale (TUR)	2	1	3	4	2	+2	112	106	+6
Nguyễn Huỳnh Thông Thạo (VIE)	1	2	3	2	4	-2	96	110	–14
Kervin Ghislain (SEY)	0	3	3	0	6	–6	65	126	–61

Sunday, 15 August
13:30
Loh Wei Sheng (MAS)	2-0	Kervin Ghislain (SEY)	21–8, 21–5	17min	Court 2
16:40
Nguyễn Huỳnh Thông Thạo (VIE)	0-2	Emre Lale (TUR)	15–21, 21–23	30min	Court 2
Monday, 16 August
09:00
Nguyễn Huỳnh Thông Thạo (VIE)	2-0	Kervin Ghislain (SEY)	21-13, 21-11	20min	Court 1
11:00
Loh Wei Sheng (MAS)	2-0	Emre Lale (TUR)	21-17, 21-9	35min	Court 2
20:30
Loh Wei Sheng (MAS)	2-0	Nguyễn Huỳnh Thông Thạo (VIE)	21-6, 21-12	30min	Court 2
21:20
Emre Lale (TUR)	2-0	Kervin Ghislain (SEY)	21-12, 21-16	20min	Court 3

==== Group H ====
Athlete	Matches			Sets			Points		
Athlete	W	L	Tot	W	L	Diff	W	L	Diff
Huang Chao (SIN)	3	0	3	6	1	+5	144	90	+54
B. Sai Praneeth (IND)	2	1	3	5	2	+3	134	108	+26
Mario Cuba (PER)	1	2	3	2	4	-2	91	115	-24
Asher Richardson (NZL)	0	3	3	0	6	–6	70	126	–56

Sunday, 15 August
14:55
B. Sai Praneeth (IND)	1-2	Huang Chao (SIN)	12–21, 21–18, 17–21	48min	Court 2
16:20
Mario Cuba (PER)	2-0	Asher Richardson (NZL)	21–13, 21–18	30min	Court 3
Monday, 16 August
10:10
B. Sai Praneeth (IND)	2-0	Asher Richardson (NZL)	21-12, 21-12	25min	Court 1
12:10
Mario Cuba (PER)	0-2	Huang Chao (SIN)	15-21, 10-21	29min	Court 2
19:55
B. Sai Praneeth (IND)	2-0	Mario Cuba (PER)	21-12, 21-12	20min	Court 2
21:40
Asher Richardson (NZL)	0-2	Huang Chao (SIN)	7-21, 8-21	20min	Court 2

== Knockout stage ==
Quarterfinals; Tuesday, 17 August
1	Kang Ji-wook (KOR)	21	14	21
9	Evert Sukamta (INA)	11	21	13
3	Prannoy Kumar (IND)	21	18	24
10	Hsieh Feng-tse (TPE)	13	21	22
5	Pisit Poodchalat (THA)	21	21
4	Huang Yuxiang (CHN)	16	19
7	Loh Wei Sheng (MAS)	21	21
32	Huang Chao (SIN)	18	16

Semifinals; Wednesday, 18 August
1	Kang Ji-wook (KOR)	21	17	17
3	Prannoy Kumar (IND)	19	21	21
5	Pisit Poodchalat (THA)	21	19	11
7	Loh Wei Sheng (MAS)	13	21	3

Final; Thursday, 19 August
3	Prannoy Kumar (IND)	15	16
5	Pisit Poodchalat (THA)	21	21

Bronze Medal Match; Thursday, 19 August
1	Kang Ji-wook (KOR)	WO
7	Loh Wei Sheng (MAS)	WD
