= Badminton at the 2010 Summer Youth Olympics =

Badminton at the I Summer Youth Olympic Games
- Venue: Singapore Indoor Stadium
- Dates: 15 – 19 August 2010
- No. of events: 2 (1 boys, 1 girls)
- Competitors: 64 (32 boys, 32 girls) from 42 nations

Badminton competition at the 2010 Summer Youth Olympics was held from 15 to 19 August 2010, at the Singapore Indoor Stadium.

== Format and schedule ==
32 players from each event were drawn into eight groups. Of the eight groups, only the group winner of each group advanced into the knockout stage, starting with the quarterfinals. The group stage were played from 15–16 August 2010, while the knockput stage were played from 17–19 August 2010.

== Qualification ==
Only players born between 1 January 1992, and 31 December 1993, are eligible to participate. Highest ranked men and women (one per National Olympic Committee) qualify according to continental quotas at youth continental championships or based on continental ranking list (Two quotas each for Africa, America and Oceania, while five quotas each for Asia and Europe). If there was no continental championships held, that continent will select the players via ranking itself as of 1 May 2010. The remaining seven places will be selected through the 2010 World Junior Championships ranking list. For the host country, they may fill one highest ranked player in each event.

== Qualifiers ==
As of 21 July 2010.

=== Boys ===
Asia

- Loh Wei Sheng (MAS)
- Kento Horiuchi (JPN)
- Hsieh Feng-tse (TPE)
- Dilshan Kariyawasam (SRI)

Europe

- Kasper Lehikoinen (FIN)
- Flemming Quach (DEN)
- Lucas Claerbout (FRA)
- Mikael Westerback (SWE)
- Nick Fransman (NED)
- Emre Lale (TUR)

Pan Am

- Mario Cuba (PER)
- Job Castillo (MEX)

Oceania

- Boris Ma (AUS)
- Asher Richardson (NZL)

Africa

- Mahmoud El Sayad (EGY)
- Mohamed Abderrahime Belarbi (ALG)

World Junior Championships

- Kang Ji-wook (KOR)
- B. Sai Praneeth (IND)
- Prannoy Kumar (IND)
- Huang Yuxiang (CHN)
- Dennis Coke (JAM)
- Pisit Poodchalat (THA)
- Evert Sukamta (INA)
- Henry Pan (CAN)
- Zenas Lam (USA)

Universality

- Mohammed Qaddoum (JOR)
- Phetphanom Keophiachan (LAO)
- Kervin Ghislain (SEY)
- Irfan Djabar (SUR)
- Nguyễn Huỳnh Thông Thạo (VIE)
- Ngosa Chongo (ZAM)

Host

- Huang Chao (SIN)

=== Girls ===
Asia

- Sapsiree Taerattanachai (THA)
- Choi Hye-in (KOR)
- Renna Suwarno (INA)
- Chiang Mei-hui (TPE)
- Vũ Thị Trang (VIE)

Europe

- Sarah Milne (GBR)
- Léa Palermo (FRA)
- Yelyzaveta Zharka (UKR)
- Lene Clausen (DEN)
- Airi Mikkelä (FIN)
- Alexandra Mathis (AUT)

Pan Am

- Cee Nantana Ketpura (USA)
- Katherine Winder (PER)

Oceania

- Tara Pilven (AUS)
- Victoria Cheng (NZL)

Africa

- Fatima Azeez (NGR)
- Kate Foo Kune (MRI)

World Junior Championships

- Misaki Matsutomo (JPN)
- Deng Xuan (CHN)
- Naoko Fukuman (JPN)
- Carolina Marín (ESP)
- Soniia Cheah Su Ya (MAS)
- Fabienne Deprez (GER)
- Josephine Wentholt (NED)
- Ebru Tunalı (TUR)
- Mariana Ugalde (MEX)
- Tracy Wong (CAN)

Universality

- Aishath Afnaan Rasheed (MDV)
- Dragana Volkanovska (MKD)
- Bridget Shamim Bangi (UGA)
- Tiaese Livi Tapumanaia (TUV)
- Lekha Shehani (SRI)

== Medal summary ==
=== Medal table ===
| Rank | Nation | Gold | Silver | Bronze | Total |
|---|---|---|---|---|---|
| 1 | Thailand | 2 | 0 | 0 | 2 |
| 2 | China | 0 | 1 | 0 | 1 |
| 2 | India | 0 | 1 | 0 | 1 |
| 4 | South Korea | 0 | 0 | 1 | 1 |
| 4 | Vietnam | 0 | 0 | 1 | 1 |
| Totals (5 entries) | | 2 | 2 | 2 | 6 |

=== Events ===
| Event | Gold | Silver | Bronze |
|---|---|---|---|
| Boys' singles | Pisit Poodchalat; Thailand | Prannoy Kumar; India | Kang Ji-wook; South Korea |
| Girls' singles | Sapsiree Taerattanachai; Thailand | Deng Xuan; China | Vũ Thị Trang; Vietnam |

== Boys' event ==
Quarterfinals; Tuesday, 17 August
1 | Kang Ji-wook (KOR) | 21 | 14 | 21
9 | Evert Sukamta (INA) | 11 | 21 | 13
3 | Prannoy Kumar (IND) | 21 | 18 | 24
10 | Hsieh Feng-tse (TPE) | 13 | 21 | 22
5 | Pisit Poodchalat (THA) | 21 | 21
4 | Huang Yuxiang (CHN) | 16 | 19
7 | Loh Wei Sheng (MAS) | 21 | 21
32 | Huang Chao (SIN) | 18 | 16

Semifinals; Wednesday, 18 August
1 | Kang Ji-wook (KOR) | 21 | 17 | 17
3 | Prannoy Kumar (IND) | 19 | 21 | 21
5 | Pisit Poodchalat (THA) | 21 | 19 | 11
7 | Loh Wei Sheng (MAS) | 13 | 21 | 3

Final; Thursday, 19 August
3 | Prannoy Kumar (IND) | 15 | 16
5 | Pisit Poodchalat (THA) | 21 | 21

| Bronze Medal Match; Thursday, 19 August |
| 1 | Kang Ji-wook (KOR) | WO |
| 7 | Loh Wei Sheng (MAS) | WD |

== Girls' event ==
Quarterfinals; Tuesday, 17 August
17 | Josephine Wentholt (NED) | 15 | 8
8 | Sarah Milne (GBR) | 21 | 21
3 | Carolina Marín (ESP) | 12 | 19
6 | Deng Xuan (CHN) | 21 | 21
7 | Sapsiree Taerattanachai (THA) | 21 | 21
4 | Soniia Cheah Su Ya (MAS) | 15 | 16
15 | Lene Clausen (DEN) | 19 | 13
12 | Vũ Thị Trang (VIE) | 21 | 21

Semifinals; Wednesday, 18 August
8 | Sarah Milne (GBR) | 12 | 12
6 | Deng Xuan (CHN) | 21 | 21
7 | Sapsiree Taerattanachai (THA) | 21 | 21
12 | Vũ Thị Trang (VIE) | 18 | 8

Final; Thursday, 19 August
6 | Deng Xuan (CHN) | 14 | 17
7 | Sapsiree Taerattanachai (THA) | 21 | 21

| Bronze Medal Match; Thursday, 19 August |
| 8 | Sarah Milne (GBR) | 15 | 20 |
| 12 | Vũ Thị Trang (VIE) | 21 | 22 |
