= 2009 BWF World Junior Championships – Boys' singles =

2009 BWF World Junior Championships Boys' Singles
Tournament details
- Dates: 28 October 2009 – 1 November 2009
- Edition: 20th
- Level: International
- Venue: Sultan Abdul Halim Stadium
- Location: Alor Setar, Malaysia

The boys' singles of the tournament 2009 BWF World Junior Championships was held on 28 October–1 November 2009. Chinese player, Tian Houwei took out the boys' singles final as he defeated Iskandar Zulkarnain Zainuddin from Malaysia in straight sets.

== Seeds ==
1. (China) Tian Houwei (champion)
2. (Malaysia) Iskandar Zulkarnain Zainuddin (final)
3. (Malaysia) Syawal Ismail (third round)
4. (Chinese Taipei) Hsu Jen-Hao (semi-final)
5. (Wales) Jamie van Hooijdonk (third round)
6. (Malaysia) Ramdan Misbun (quarter-final)
7. (China) Li Yisheng (quarter-final)
8. (Denmark) Emil Holst (quarter-final)
9. (Finland) Kasper Lehikoinen (third round)
10. (Germany) Nikolaj Persson (fourth round)
11. (Sweden) Mattias Borg (second round)
12. (Thailand) Pisit Poodchalat (fourth round)
13. (India) Sai Praneeth (fourth round)
14. (Netherlands) Jordy Hilbink (third round)
15. (Malaysia) Zulfadli Zulkiffli (fourth round)
16. (Vietnam) Lê Hà Anh (second round)

== Draw ==
=== Finals ===
Quarterfinals
1	(China) Tian Houwei	21	21
5/8	(Malaysia) Ramdan Misbun	13	11
(Chinese Taipei) Yang Chih-Hsun	14	19
(Japan) Tatsuya Watanabe	21	21
5/8	(Denmark) Emil Holst	19	13
3/4	(Chinese Taipei) Hsu Jen-Hao	21	21
5/8	(China) Li Yisheng	21	23	8
2	(Malaysia) Iskandar Zulkarnain Zainuddin	19	25	21

Semifinals
1	(China) Tian Houwei	22	21
(Japan) Tatsuya Watanabe	20	13
3/4	(Chinese Taipei) Hsu Jen-Hao	17	21	16
2	(Malaysia) Iskandar Zulkarnain Zainuddin	21	7	21

Final
1	(China) Tian Houwei	21	21
2	(Malaysia) Iskandar Zulkarnain Zainuddin	12	17

=== Top half ===
==== Section 1 ====
First round
(Mexico) A Lopez	13	9
(China) Liu C	21	21
(Indonesia) Hermansyah	21	21
(Sri Lanka) H Perera	18	11
(Sri Lanka) N Hettiarachchi	14	21	21
(Singapore) Tan KH	21	6	10
(Australia) E Hung	19	17
(Brazil) T Garboggini	21	21
(India) P Kumar	21	21
(Macau) Lam CL	4	7

Second round
1	(China) Tian HW	21	21
(India) E Naqvi	19	11
(China) Liu C	21	21
(Indonesia) Hermansyah	19	10
9/16	(Malaysia) Z Zulkiffli	21	21
(Sri Lanka) N Hettiarachchi	7	16
(Brazil) T Garboggini	5	12
(India) P Kumar	21	21

Third round
1	(China) Tian HW	21	21
(China) Liu C	17	18
9/16	(Malaysia) Z Zulkiffli	24	22
(India) P Kumar	22	12

Fourth round
1	(China) Tian HW	21	21
9/16	(Malaysia) Z Zulkiffli	19	17

==== Section 2 ====
First round
(Macau) Cheang WL	15	9
(Japan) H Takeuchi	21	21
(Iran) M Khanjani
(Cambodia) C Sensivoth	wo
(Indonesia) A Trisnanto	21	18	21
(Hong Kong) Tam CH	14	21	6
(Vietnam) Le V
(Cambodia) S Kimhong	wo
(Canada) J Donaldson	17	22
(Nepal) R Tamang	21	24
(China) Li Q	21	21
(Japan) K Momota	9	12

Second round
5/8	(Malaysia) R Misbun	21	21
(Japan) H Takeuchi	12	14
(Iran) M Khanjani	8	19
(Indonesia) A Trisnanto	21	21
9/16	(Germany) N Persson	21	21
(Vietnam) Le V	2	5
(Nepal) R Tamang	12	8
(China) Li Q	21	21

Third round
5/8	(Malaysia) R Misbun	21	21	21
(Indonesia) A Trisnanto	11	23	19
9/16	(Germany) N Persson	21	22
(China) Li Q	9	20

Fourth round
5/8	(Malaysia) R Misbun	21	28
9/16	(Germany) N Persson	18	26

==== Section 3 ====
First round
(Russia) A Yartsev	21	21
(France) T Rouxel	12	12
(Indonesia) A Marteen	21	21
(Pakistan) M Bhatti	14	9
(Hong Kong) Lee CH	21	21
(Turkey) E Aslan	13	9
(New Zealand) A Richardson	21	12	11
(Chinese Taipei) Yang C-H	18	21	21
(Switzerland) N Blondel	15	13
(Thailand) W Buranakruea	21	21

Second round
3/4	(Malaysia) S Ismail
(Egypt) D Othman	wo
(Russia) A Yartsev	11	16
(Indonesia) A Marteen	21	21
9/16	(Sweden) M Borg	22	20	12
(Hong Kong) Lee CH	20	22	21
(Chinese Taipei) Yang C-H	21	23
(Thailand) W Buranakruea	17	21

Third round
3/4	(Malaysia) S Ismail	19	21	16
(Indonesia) A Marteen	21	18	21
(Hong Kong) Lee CH	20	12
(Chinese Taipei) Yang C-H	22	21

Fourth round
(Indonesia) A Marteen	18	21	14
(Chinese Taipei) Yang C-H	21	16	21

==== Section 4 ====
First round
(Canada) A Chee	15	18
(New Zealand) L Charlesworth	21	21
(Denmark) F Quach	21	21
(New Zealand) B Matheson	15	11
(Chinese Taipei) Lin Y-H	21	21
(Sri Lanka) O Fernando	8	17
(England) T Penty	21	10	16
(Philippines) P Magnaye	14	21	21
(England) M Nottingham	21	21
(Switzerland) J Kleiner	12	14
(Japan) T Watanabe	21	22	21
(Philippines) P Escueta	13	24	6

Second round
5/8	(Wales) J van Hooijdonk	21	21
(New Zealand) L Charlesworth	17	17
(Denmark) F Quach	21	16	21
(Chinese Taipei) Lin Y-H	18	21	19
9/16	(Vietnam) Le HA	21	13	18
(Philippines) P Magnaye	15	21	21
(England) M Nottingham	14	6
(Japan) T Watanabe	21	21

Third round
5/8	(Wales) J van Hooijdonk	15	7
(Denmark) F Quach	21	21
(Philippines) P Magnaye	15	9
(Japan) T Watanabe	21	21

Fourth round
(Denmark) F Quach	13	10
(Japan) T Watanabe	21	21

=== Bottom half ===
==== Section 5 ====
First round
(Russia) D Balandin	21	21
(Australia) B Chu	14	4
(Germany) P Kaemnitz	11	18
(Indonesia) E Sukamta	21	21
(Germany) A Heinz	15	21	16
(Japan) S Hoshino	21	15	21
(Philippines) P Vivas	21	21
(Australia) N David	9	22
(Nepal) S Tamrakar	11	23	10
(Singapore) Tang KS	21	21	21
(Norway) M Fartum	9	18
(Mexico) L Munoz	21	21

Second round
(Russia) D Balandin	11	9
(Indonesia) E Sukamta	21	21
(Japan) S Hoshino	16	21	20
9/16	(Netherlands) J Hilbink	21	13	22
(Philippines) P Vivas	21	21
(Singapore) Tang KS	16	18
(Mexico) L Munoz	18	18
5/8	(Denmark) E Holst	21	21

Third round
(Indonesia) E Sukamta	21	21
9/16	(Netherlands) J Hilbink	7	10
(Philippines) P Vivas	9	11
5/8	(Denmark) E Holst	21	21

Fourth round
(Indonesia) E Sukamta	21	18	17
5/8	(Denmark) E Holst	12	21	21

==== Section 6 ====
First round
(India) S Reddy	21	14	24
(Denmark) R Fladberg	8	21	22
(Thailand) P Supasri	21	21
(New Zealand) P Tayalan	10	12
(Canada) T Lam	21	15	19
(Sri Lanka) D Kariyawasam	13	21	21
(Cambodia) L Sopheaktra	wo
(France) M Baumann
(Cambodia) L Khlaychchit	wo
(Switzerland) I Jenny

Second round
(India) S Reddy	16	21	21
(Thailand) P Supasri	21	14	17
(Sri Lanka) D Kariyawasam	10	15
9/16	(India) S Praneeth	21	21
(France) M Baumann	21	21
(Switzerland) I Jenny	9	17
(Canada) N Lee	16	9
3/4	(Chinese Taipei) Hsu J-H	21	21

Third round
(India) S Reddy	9	10
9/16	(India) S Praneeth	21	21
(France) M Baumann	9	11
3/4	(Chinese Taipei) Hsu J-H	21	21

Fourth round
9/16	(India) S Praneeth	13	21	18
3/4	(Chinese Taipei) Hsu J-H	21	17	21

==== Section 7 ====
First round
(Hong Kong) Ng KL	21	21
(Czech Republic) L Zevl	15	14
(Kazakhstan) A Niyazov	8	8
(Vietnam) Bui QT	21	21
(Macau) F Albertino	10	7
(Chinese Taipei) Lin S-K	21	21
(Turkey) R Ozturk	8	15
(Singapore) Koh JY	21	21
(Macau) Lei MF	8	8
(France) L Claerbout	21	21
(Turkey) E Vural	21	19	21
(England) C Coles	19	21	23

Second round
(Hong Kong) Ng KL	19	19
(Vietnam) Bui QT	21	21
(Chinese Taipei) Lin S-K	15	19
9/16	(Finland) K Lehikoinen	21	21
(Singapore) Koh JY	17	14
(France) L Claerbout	21	21
(England) C Coles	19	18
5/8	(China) Li YS	21	21

Third round
(Vietnam) Bui QT	21	12	21
9/16	(Finland) K Lehikoinen	16	21	14
(France) L Claerbout	12	14
5/8	(China) Li YS	21	21

Fourth round
(Vietnam) Bui QT	11	15
5/8	(China) Li YS	21	21

==== Section 8 ====
First round
(Nepal) B Shrestha
(Egypt) H Bashah	wo
(Hong Kong) Chan DL	24	21	21
(Pakistan) T Arab	26	16	15
(Germany) M Schwenger	23	21
(Russia) K Abramov	21	18
(Nepal) B Gurung
(Turkey) Y Ozkan	wo
(Austria) V Vattanirappel	21	14	14
(Singapore) G Ong	18	21	21

Second round
(Nepal) B Shrestha	12	9
(Hong Kong) Chan DL	21	21
(Germany) M Schwenger	4	11
9/16	(Thailand) P Poodchalat	21	21
(Nepal) B Gurung	15	6
(Singapore) G Ong	21	21
(Australia) A Gobinathan	5	10
2	(Malaysia) I Zainuddin	21	21

Third round
(Hong Kong) Chan DL	17	12
9/16	(Thailand) P Poodchalat	21	21
(Singapore) G Ong	16	11
2	(Malaysia) I Zainuddin	21	21

Fourth round
9/16	(Thailand) P Poodchalat	21	15	17
2	(Malaysia) I Zainuddin	18	21	21
