= Jamaica at the 2010 Summer Youth Olympics =

- IOC code: JAM
- NOC: Jamaica Olympic Association

in Singapore
- Competitors: 15 in 3 sports
- Flag bearer: Kendese Nangle
- Medals Ranked 50th: Gold 1 Silver 0 Bronze 0 Total 1

Summer Youth Olympics appearances
- 2010; 2014; 2018

Jamaica participated in the 2010 Summer Youth Olympics in Singapore.

The Jamaican team included 15 athletes competing in 3 sports: athletics, badminton and swimming.

== Medalists ==
Medal	Name	Sport	Event	Date
Gold	Odean Skeen	Athletics	Boys' 100m	21 Aug
Gold	Odean Skeen	Athletics	Boys' medley relay(in Mixed-NOC Team)	23 Aug

== Athletics ==
=== Boys ===
Track and Road Events

Athletes	Event	Qualification		Final	
Athletes	Event	Result	Rank	Result	Rank
Odean Skeen	Boys’ 100m	10.63	2 Q	10.42	Gold medal
Lennox Williams	Boys’ 400m	52.27	19 qC	DNS	
Stefan Fennell	Boys’ 110m Hurdles	13.89	7 Q	13.54	4
Caio Dos Santos (BRA); Odean Skeen (JAM); Najee Glass (USA); Luguelín Santos (DOM)	Boys’ Medley Relay			1:51.38	Gold medal

Field Events

Athletes	Event	Qualification		Final	
Athletes	Event	Result	Rank	Result	Rank
Ashinia Miller	Boys’ Shot Put	18.30	11 qB	17.76	13
Fedrick Dacres	Boys’ Discus Throw	52.69	12 qB	54.79	10

=== Girls ===
Track and Road Events

Athletes	Event	Qualification		Final	
Athletes	Event	Result	Rank	Result	Rank
Shericka Jackson	Girls’ 200m	24.24	4 Q	24.08	4
Olivia James	Girls’ 400m	55.05	8 Q	54.14	6
Megan Simmonds	Girls’ 100m Hurdles	13.64	2 Q	13.62	4

Field Events

Athletes	Event	Qualification		Final	
Athletes	Event	Result	Rank	Result	Rank
Sasha Gaye Marston	Girls’ Discus Throw	43.73	9 qB	40.36	10
Janieve Russell	Girls’ Long Jump	5.87	8 Q	5.83	7
Rochelle Farquarson	Girls’ Triple Jump	12.40	4 Q	12.57	4
Shanice Hall	Girls’ High Jump	NM qB		DNS	

== Badminton ==
Boys

Athlete	Event	Group Stage				Knock-Out Stage			
Athlete	Event	Match 1	Match 2	Match 3	Rank	Quarterfinal	Semifinal	Final	Rank
Dennis Coke	Boys’ Singles	Keophiachan (LAO) L 0-2 (16-21, 11-21)	Kumar (IND) L 0-2 (9-21, 10-21)	Claerbout (FRA) L 0-2 (6-21, 6-21)	4	Did not advance			

== Swimming ==
Athletes	Event	Heat		Semifinal		Final	
Athletes	Event	Time	Position	Time	Position	Time	Position
Brain Forte	Boys’ 50m Freestyle	25.10	28	Did not advance			
Brain Forte	Boys’ 100m Freestyle	55.62	42	Did not advance			
Kendese Nangle	Girls’ 50m Backstroke	31.09	14 Q	30.91	12	Did not advance	
Kendese Nangle	Girls’ 100m Backstroke	1:06.43	27	Did not advance			
