= Laos at the 2010 Summer Youth Olympics =

- IOC code: LAO
- NOC: National Olympic Committee of Lao

in Singapore
- Competitors: 3 in 3 sports
- Flag bearer: Sitthideth Khanthavong

Summer Youth Olympics appearances
- 2010; 2014; 2018

Laos competed at the 2010 Summer Youth Olympics, the inaugural Youth Olympic Games, held in Singapore from 14 August to 26 August 2010.

== Athletics ==
Track and Road Events

Athletes	Event	Qualification		Final	
Athletes	Event	Result	Rank	Result	Rank
Sitthideth Khanthavong	Boys' 100m	12.11	30 qD	11.92	27

== Badminton ==
Boys

Athlete	Event	Group Stage				Knock-Out Stage			
Athlete	Event	Match 1	Match 2	Match 3	Rank	Quarterfinal	Semifinal	Final	Rank
Phetphanom Keophiachan	Singles	Coke (JAM) W 2-0 (21-16, 21-11)	Claerbout (FRA) L 0-2 (12-21, 8-21)	Kumar (IND) L 0-2 (6-21, 6-21)	3	Did not advance			

== Swimming ==
Athletes	Event	Heat		Semifinal		Final	
Athletes	Event	Time	Position	Time	Position	Time	Position
Daoheuang Inthavong	Girls’ 50m Backstroke	41.22	22	Did not advance			
Daoheuang Inthavong	Girls’ 100m Backstroke	1:29.89	36	Did not advance			
