= Vietnam at the 2010 Summer Youth Olympics =

- IOC code: VIE
- NOC: Vietnam Olympic Committee

in Singapore
- Competitors: 13 in 7 sports
- Flag bearer: Nguyen Quoc Cuong
- Medals Ranked 41st: Gold 1 Silver 1 Bronze 2 Total 4

Summer Youth Olympics appearances
- 2010; 2014; 2018

Vietnam competed at the 2010 Summer Youth Olympics, the inaugural Youth Olympic Games, held in Singapore from 14 August to 26 August 2010.

The Vietnamese team comprised 13 athletes competing in 7 sports: aquatics (swimming), athletics, shooting, badminton, taekwondo, wrestling, weightlifting.

== Medalists ==
Medal	Name	Sport	Event	Date
Gold	Thạch Kim Tuấn	Weightlifting	Men's 56kg	16 Aug
Silver	Nguyễn Thanh Thảo	Taekwondo	Women's 55kg	17 Aug
Bronze	Nguyễn Quốc Cường	Taekwondo	Men's 55kg	16 Aug
Bronze	Vũ Thị Trang	Badminton	Girls' Singles	19 Aug

== Athletics ==
=== Girls ===
Field Events

Athletes	Event	Qualification		Final	
Athletes	Event	Result	Rank	Result	Rank
Nguyễn Thị Tươi	Girls’ Triple Jump	11.75	13 qB	11.81	11

== Badminton ==
Boys

Athlete	Event	Group Stage				Knock-Out Stage			
Athlete	Event	Match 1	Match 2	Match 3	Rank	Quarterfinal	Semifinal	Final	Rank
Nguyễn Huỳnh Thông Thạo	Boys’ Singles	Lale (TUR) L 0-2 (15-21, 21-23)	Ghislain (SEY) W 2-0 (21-13, 21-11)	Loh (MAS) L 0-2 (6-21, 12-21)	3	Did not advance			

Girls

Athlete	Event	Group Stage				Knock-Out Stage			
Athlete	Event	Match 1	Match 2	Match 3	Rank	Quarterfinal	Semifinal	Final	Rank
Vũ Thị Trang	Girls’ Singles	Choi (KOR) W 2-1 (13-21, 21-18, 21-12)	Zharka (UKR) W 2-0 (21-16, 21-14)	Fukuman (JPN) W 2-1 (21-15, 16-21, 21-10)	1 Q	Clauden (DEN) W 2-0 (21-19, 21-13)	Taerattanachai (THA) L 0-2 (18-21, 8-21)	3rd Place Match; Milne (GBR) W 2-0 (21-15, 22-20)	Bronze medal

== Shooting ==
Pistol

Athlete	Event	Qualification		Final		
Athlete	Event	Score	Rank	Score	Total	Rank
Nguyễn Thị Ngọc Dương	Girls' 10m Air Pistol	360	19	Did not advance		

== Swimming ==
Athletes	Event	Heat		Semifinal		Final	
Athletes	Event	Time	Position	Time	Position	Time	Position
Hoàng Quý Phước	Boys’ 100m Freestyle	53.36	36	Did not advance			
Hoàng Quý Phước	Boys’ 100m Butterfly	54.74	7 Q	54.71	11	Did not advance	
Trần Tâm Nguyện	Girls’ 100m Freestyle	59.39	28	Did not advance			
Trần Tâm Nguyện	Girls’ 200m Freestyle	2:07.93	24			Did not advance	
Nguyễn Thị Kim Tuyến	Girls’ 100m Butterfly	1:01.40	8 Q	1:01.56	11	Did not advance	
Nguyễn Thị Kim Tuyến	Girls’ 200m Butterfly	2:15.53	9			Did not advance	

== Taekwondo ==
Athlete	Event	Preliminary	Quarterfinal	Semifinal	Final	Rank
Nguyễn Quốc Cường	Boys' -55kg	BYE	Óscar Muñoz (COL); W 4-3	Nursultan Mamayev (KAZ); L 5-6	did not advance	Bronze medal
Nguyễn Thị Thanh Thảo	Girls' -55kg	Sara Neves Bolivar (STP); W KO R1 0:58	Ali Rahman Ben (TUN); W 3-1	Shafinas Abdul Rahman (SIN); W 9-8	Jade Jones (GBR); L 6-9	Silver medal

== Weightlifting ==
Athlete	Event	Snatch	Clean & Jerk	Total	Rank
Thạch Kim Tuấn	Boys' 56kg	116	140	256	Gold medal
Nguyễn Thiện Quốc	Boys' 62kg	109	130	239	4
Nguyễn Thị Hồng	Girls' 48kg	70	81	151	4

== Wrestling ==
Freestyle

Athlete	Event	Pools		Final	Rank
Athlete	Event	Groups	Rank	Final	Rank
Nguyễn Thị Diễm Quỳnh	Girls' 52kg	Yuan (CHN); L 0–2 (0–2, 0–4)	2	3rd Place Match; Gadaeva (UZB); L Fall (0–3, 1–0, 0-4)	4
Nguyễn Thị Diễm Quỳnh	Girls' 52kg	Lovik (NOR); W Fall (2–3)	2	3rd Place Match; Gadaeva (UZB); L Fall (0–3, 1–0, 0-4)	4
Nguyễn Thị Diễm Quỳnh	Girls' 52kg	Canon (COL); W 2–0 (1–0, 1–0)	2	3rd Place Match; Gadaeva (UZB); L Fall (0–3, 1–0, 0-4)	4
