= Boxing at the 2010 Summer Youth Olympics – Men's 54 kg =

Boxing competitions

These are the results of the Men's Bantam 54 kg competition in boxing at the 2010 Summer Youth Olympics in Singapore. Preliminaries were held on August 21, semifinals on August 22, 5th place bout on August 23, the bronze medal bout on August 24 and the Final bout on August 25. Unlike world championships and the Olympic Games, only one bronze medal is awarded.

== Medalists ==
Robeisy Eloy Ramirez
Cuba
Shiva Thapa
India
Dawid Michelus
Poland

== Results ==
Preliminaries
Alexandru Marin (ROU) | 0
Dawid Michelus (POL) | 4
Robeisy Eloy Ramirez (CUB) | 17
Stan Nicette (SEY) | 3

Semifinals
Zack Davies (GBR) | 4
Shiva Thapa (IND) | 14
Dawid Michelus (POL) | 1
Robeisy Eloy Ramirez (CUB) | 3

Final
Shiva Thapa (IND) | 2
Robeisy Eloy Ramirez (CUB) | 5
Third place
Zack Davies (GBR) | 7
Dawid Michelus (POL) | 12

| 5th place bout |
| Alexandru Marin (ROU) | 10 |
| Stan Nicette (SEY) | 2 |
