= Seychelles at the 2010 Summer Youth Olympics =

- IOC code: SEY
- NOC: Seychelles Olympic and Commonwealth Games Association

in Singapore
- Competitors: 4 in 4 sports
- Flag bearer: Kervin Ghislain

Summer Youth Olympics appearances
- 2010; 2014; 2018

Seychelles competed at the 2010 Summer Youth Olympics, the inaugural Youth Olympic Games, held in Singapore from August 14 to August 26, 2010. The nation was represented by the Seychelles Olympic and Commonwealth Games Association, which sent a total of four athletes to compete in four sports. The flagbearer at the opening ceremony for the nation was badminton player Kervin Ghislain. Seychelles' Olympic team was one of the 106 that did not win a single medal at the Games.

== Athletics ==
Sole competitor for the nation in athletics Marie-Michell Athanase, competing in the girls' 200 metres, set a season best with a time of 27.10 seconds but failed to make it into the medal final. She progressed to the B Final (non-medal final), where she set a personal best in the event with a time of 26.44 seconds.

=== Girls ===
Track and Road Events

Athlete	Event	Heat		Final		
Athlete	Event	Result	Rank	Type	Result	Rank
Marie-Michell Athanase	Girls' 200 m	27.10 (SB)	14	B	26.44 (PB)	14

== Badminton ==
Kervin Ghislain, the sole competitor in badminton for Seychelles, played three matches in the group play of the boys' singles, and was defeated in all three. As such he did not advance to the quarterfinals and beyond.

Athlete	Event	Group stage				Knock-Out Stage			
Athlete	Event	Match 1	Match 2	Match 3	Rank	Quarterfinal	Semifinal	Final	Rank
Kervin Ghislain	Boys' singles	Loh (MAS); L 0-2 (8–21, 5-21)	Nguyen (VIE); L 0-2 (13-21, 11-21)	Lare (TUR); L 0-2 (12-21, 16-21)	4	Did not advance			

== Boxing ==
Boxer Stan Nicette competed in the men's bantam 54kg. In the preliminaries, he fought against Robeisy Eloy Ramirez of Cuba and lost with a score of 17–3, thus did not progress to the semifinals.

Boys

Athlete	Event	Preliminaries	Semifinals	Final	Rank
Stan Nicette	Bantamweight (54kg)	Robeisy Eloy Ramirez (CUB); L 3-17	Did not advance	5th place Bout; Alexandru Marin (ROU); L RSC R3 2:30	6

== Swimming ==
Shannon Austin was the only Seychellois athlete at the 2010 Summer Youth Olympics to compete in more than one event; namely, the girls' 200 metres freestyle and the girls' 400 metres freestyle. Despite clinching a second place in heat 2 of the girls' 200 metres freestyle, her timing was not enough to secure her a place in the final. She did not progress to the final either in the girls' 400 metres freestyle.

Athlete	Events	Heat		Final	
Athlete	Events	Time	Position	Time	Position
Shannon Austin	Girls' 200 m freestyle	2:10.54	33	Did not advance	
Shannon Austin	Girls' 400 m freestyle	4:34.81	23	Did not advance	

== See also ==
- Seychelles at the Olympics
