= 2011 BWF World Junior Championships – boys' singles =

2011 BWF World Junior Championships boys' singles
Tournament details
- Dates: 2 – 6 November 2011
- Edition: 13th
- Level: International
- Venue: Taoyuan Arena
- Location: Taoyuan City, Taiwan

The boys' singles event for the 2011 BWF World Junior Championships was held between 2 November and 6 November. Zulfadli Zulkiffli became first singles player from Malaysia to win gold medal.

== Seeded ==
1. (Denmark) Viktor Axelsen (final)
2. (Malaysia) Zulfadli Zulkiffli (champion)
3. (Japan) Kento Momota (semifinals)
4. (India) Sameer Verma (semifinals)
5. (Turkey) Emre Lale (third round)
6. (India) Pratul Joshi (second round)
7. (India) Srikanth Kidambi (fourth round)
8. (Hong Kong) Ng Ka Long (quarter-finals)
9. (Indonesia) Arif Gifar Ramadhan (fourth round)
10. (Indonesia) Shesar Hiren Rhustavito (quarter-finals)
11. (Malaysia) Soong Joo Ven (third round)
12. (Denmark) Kim Bruun (third round)
13. (France) Lucas Corvée (third round)
14. (Germany) Kai Schäfer (fourth round)
15. (Russia) Anatoliy Yartsev (third round)
16. (Hong Kong) Tam Chun Hei (fourth round)

== Draw ==
=== Finals ===
Quarterfinals
1	(Denmark) Viktor Axelsen	21	21
(Thailand) Khosit Phetpradab	7	18
3/4	(India) Sameer Verma	21	21
5/8	(Hong Kong) Ng Ka Long	15	16
9/16	(Indonesia) Shesar Hiren Rhustavito	21	15	15
3/4	(Japan) Kento Momota	16	21	21
(Indonesia) Wisnu Yuli Prasetyo	21	10	16
2	(Malaysia) Zulfadli Zulkiffli	10	21	21

Semifinals
1	(Denmark) Viktor Axelsen	21	21
3/4	(India) Sameer Verma	19	19
3/4	(Japan) Kento Momota	18	18
2	(Malaysia) Zulfadli Zulkiffli	21	21

Final
1	(Denmark) Viktor Axelsen	18	21	19
2	(Malaysia) Zulfadli Zulkiffli	21	9	21

=== Top half ===
==== Section 1 ====
First round
(South Korea) Lee H-J	21	21
(Singapore) A Chew	9	12
(France) J Maio	16	14
(Finland) K Koljonen	21	21

Second round
1	(Denmark) V Axelsen	21	21
(Australia) P S Low	4	8
(Sri Lanka) C Karunaratne	21	12	10
(South Korea) Lee H-J	16	21	21
9/16	(Germany) K Schäfer	21	21
(Mexico) A Quadri	12	5
(Hong Kong) Tang CM	21	22	13
(Finland) K Koljonen	16	24	21

Third round
1	(Denmark) V Axelsen	21	21
(South Korea) Lee H-J	11	16
9/16	(Germany) K Schäfer	21	21
(Finland) K Koljonen	13	12

Fourth round
1	(Denmark) V Axelsen	21	21
9/16	(Germany) K Schäfer	10	14

==== Section 2 ====
First round
(Canada) A D'Souza	11	16
(Indonesia) R Subagja	21	21
(Thailand) K Phetpradab	21	21
(Egypt) H Samy	9	8

Second round
5/8	(Turkey) E Lale	21	21
(Vietnam) Le TT	11	14
(Japan) N Sekiguchi	22	8	16
(Indonesia) R Subagja	20	21	21
9/16	(Malaysia) Soong JV	21	21	21
(England) A Cheng	23	15	11
(Chinese Taipei) Huang K-X	16	6
(Thailand) K Phetpradab	21	21

Third round
5/8	(Turkey) E Lale	19	7
(Indonesia) R Subagja	21	21
9/16	(Malaysia) Soong JV	18	20
(Thailand) K Phetpradab	21	22

Fourth round
(Indonesia) R Subagja	21	19	17
(Thailand) K Phetpradab	16	21	21

==== Section 3 ====
First round
(Malaysia) Goh GC	21	21
(Egypt) Y El Fattah	14	11
(Japan) A Koga	21	21
(Denmark) R Grill	14	10

Second round
3/4	(India) S Verma	21	21
(England) R Walker	17	9
(Macau) Wong CC	9	9
(Malaysia) Goh GC	21	21
9/16	(Indonesia) A Ramadhan	21	18	21
(Netherlands) V de Vries	18	21	12
(Lithuania) P Bartušis	10	15
(Japan) A Koga	21	21

Third round
3/4	(India) S Verma	21	21
(Malaysia) Goh GC	13	17
9/16	(Indonesia) A Ramadhan	21	21	21
(Japan) A Koga	19	23	19

Fourth round
3/4	(India) S Verma	21	21
9/16	(Indonesia) A Ramadhan	18	17

==== Section 4 ====
First round
(Finland) M Köngäs	21	10	20
(Singapore) Ngo YC	15	21	22
(Sweden) C Nilsson	14	15
(South Korea) Jung J-W	21	21

Second round
5/8	(Hong Kong) Ng KL	21	16	21
(Chinese Taipei) Wang T-W	13	21	8
(United States) A Susanto	7	17
(Singapore) Ngo YC	21	21
9/16	(Russia) A Yartsev	21	21
(Philippines) M Cudiamat	15	6
(Canada) C Wong	12	7
(South Korea) Jung J-W	21	21

Third round
5/8	(Hong Kong) Ng KL	21	21
(Singapore) Ngo YC	19	13
9/16	(Russia) A Yartsev	18	21	18
(South Korea) Jung J-W	21	17	21

Fourth round
5/8	(Hong Kong) Ng KL	21	21
(South Korea) Jung J-W	19	18

=== Bottom half ===
==== Section 5 ====
First round
(Lithuania) A Plavin	13	19
(England) T Wolfenden	21	21
(Macau) J King	11	12
(Turkey) T Özsoy	21	21

Second round
(England) T Wolfenden	21	20	21
(United States) J Kuo	12	22	13
(Egypt) M El Sayad	7	10
9/16	(Indonesia) S Rhustavito	21	21
(Turkey) T Özsoy	21	8
(Philippines) P Escueta	23	421
(Malaysia) N Ayub	21	9	8
5/8	(India) S Kidambi	13	21	21

Third round
(England) T Wolfenden	9	11
9/16	(Indonesia) S Rhustavito	21	21
(Philippines) P Escueta	9	9
5/8	(India) S Kidambi	21	21

Fourth round
9/16	(Indonesia) S Rhustavito	11	21	21
5/8	(India) S Kidambi	21	13	16

==== Section 6 ====
First round-Byes
(Australia) A Selladurai	21	19
(Russia) A Sorokin	23	21
(South Korea) Jung Y-J	21	21
(Germany) M Lamsfuß	19	9

Second round
(Russia) A Sorokin	12	19
(Chinese Taipei) Wan C-H	21	21
(Thailand) B Thumpanichwong	10	20
9/16	(Hong Kong) Tam CH	21	22
(South Korea) Jung Y-J	10	21	21
(Canada) N Yakura	21	9	10
(Czech Republic) V Šelong	16	14
3/4	(Japan) K Momota	21	21

Third round
(Chinese Taipei) Wan C-H	15	11
9/16	(Hong Kong) Tam CH	21	21
(South Korea) Jung Y-J	16	14
3/4	(Japan) K Momota	21	21

Fourth round
9/16	(Hong Kong) Tam CH	21	18
3/4	(Japan) K Momota	23	21

==== Section 7 ====
First round
(Thailand) S Thammasin	21	24
(Turkey) A Şenol	11	22
(United States) D Chow	10	11
(Chinese Taipei) Chung S-H	21	21

Second round
(Thailand) S Thammasin	23	29	21
(Russia) S Sirant	21	30	15
(Sri Lanka) O Dharmawardena	9	9
9/16	(France) L Corvée	21	21
(Chinese Taipei) Chung S-H	21	13	16
(Indonesia) W Prasetyo	17	21	21
(Japan) Y Kaneko	21	21
5/8	(India) P Joshi	15	17

Third round
(Thailand) S Thammasin	21	21
9/16	(France) L Corvée	17	17
(Indonesia) W Prasetyo	21	21
(Japan) Y Kaneko	10	10

Fourth round
(Thailand) S Thammasin	16	16
(Indonesia) W Prasetyo	21	21

==== Section 8 ====
First round
(Guatemala) H Humblers	17	21	14
(Sweden) A Hjelm	21	13	21
(Vietnam) Phạm CC	21	21
(Australia) T Wong	10	9

Second round
(Sweden) A Hjelm	12	15
(Singapore) G Ong	21	21
(South Korea) Kim D-J	13	16
9/16	(Denmark) K Bruun	21	21
(Vietnam) Phạm CC	21	21
(Germany) M Laibacher	18	12
(Finland) H Aarnio	16	11
2	(Malaysia) Z Zulkiffli	21	21

Third round
(Singapore) G Ong	21	21
9/16	(Denmark) K Bruun	18	15
(Vietnam) Phạm CC	15	15
2	(Malaysia) Z Zulkiffli	21	21

Fourth round
(Singapore) G Ong	9	19
2	(Malaysia) Z Zulkiffli	21	21
