= Taekwondo at the 2010 Summer Youth Olympics – Boys' 55 kg =

Taekwondo competition

The boys' 55 kg competition in taekwondo at the 2010 Summer Youth Olympics in Singapore took place on August 16. A total of 12 men competed in this event, limited to fighters whose body weight was less than 55 kilograms. Preliminaries started at 15:04, quarterfinals started at 17:00, semifinals at 19:02 and the final at 20:09. Two bronze medals were awarded at the Taekwondo competitions.

== Medalists ==
Gold	Kaveh Rezaei; Iran
Silver	Nursultan Mamayev; Kazakhstan
Bronze	Jia Tan; Singapore
Bronze	Quoc Cuong Nguyen; Vietnam

== Results ==
Legend

- PTG — Won by Points Gap
- SUP — Won by Superiority
- OT — Won on over time (Golden Point)

=== Main bracket ===
First round
Mohamed Asal (EGY)	DSQ
Peterson Sertune (HAI)
Thiaerry Mabounda (CGO)	4
Naing Dwe Shein Shein (MYA)	5
Óscar Muñoz (COL)	10
Ebrahim Ahmed (BRN)	7
Nursultan Mamayev (KAZ)	8
Ranjan Shrestha (NEP)	3

Quarterfinals
Kaveh Rezaei (IRI)
Peterson Sertune (HAI)	RSC 1; 0:55
Naing Dwe Shein Shein (MYA)	5
Jia Tan (SIN)	6
Quoc Cuong Nguyen (VIE)	4
Óscar Muñoz (COL)	3
Nursultan Mamayev (KAZ)	2
José Cobas (CUB)	0

Semifinals
Kaveh Rezaei (IRI)
Jia Tan (SIN)	RSC 3; 1:33
Quoc Cuong Nguyen (VIE)	5
Nursultan Mamayev (KAZ)	6

Final
Kaveh Rezaei (IRI)	4
Nursultan Mamayev (KAZ)	2
