= Swimming at the 2010 Summer Youth Olympics – Girls' 100 metre backstroke =

The women's 100 metre backstroke heats and semifinals at the 2010 Youth Olympic Games took place on August 17 with the final on August 18 at the Singapore Sports School.

== Medalists ==
Gold	Daryna Zevina; Ukraine	1:01.51
Silver	Bay Anqi; China	1:01.97
Bronze	Alexandra Papusha; Russia	1:02.15

== Heats ==
=== Heat 1 ===
Rank	Lane	Name	Nationality	Time	Notes
1	6	Carina Macavei	Romania	1:06.27	
2	3	Lee-Ann Rose	Barbados	1:08.41	
3	4	Sara Hayajna	Jordan	1:09.04	
4	5	Daoheuang Inthavong	Laos	1:29.89	

=== Heat 2 ===
Rank	Lane	Name	Nationality	Time	Notes
1	5	Renee Stothard	New Zealand	1:04.94	Q
2	3	Oneida Cooper	South Africa	1:06.05	
3	6	Gabriela Ņikitina	Latvia	1:06.30	
4	4	Alexandra Dobrin	Romania	1:06.31	
5	2	Kendese Nangle	Jamaica	1:06.43	
6	7	Adeline Winata	Singapore	1:08.06	
7	8	Lara Butler	Cayman Islands	1:08.98	
8	1	Chriselle Koh	Singapore	1:09.93	

=== Heat 3 ===
Rank	Lane	Name	Nationality	Time	Notes
1	4	Daryna Zevina	Ukraine	1:02.55	Q
2	3	Ida Lindborg	Sweden	1:04.17	Q
3	2	Yulduz Kuchkarova	Uzbekistan	1:04.63	Q
4	8	Marie Jugnet	France	1:04.77	Q
5	1	Martina Elhenicka	Czech Republic	1:04.80	Q
6	6	Mina Ochi	Japan	1:05.52	
7	7	Mabel Sulic	Croatia	1:07.50	
8	5	Yekaterina Rudenko	Kazakhstan	1:08.32	

=== Heat 4 ===
Rank	Lane	Name	Nationality	Time	Notes
1	6	Lovisa Eriksson	Sweden	1:04.10	Q
2	5	Allison Roberts	United States	1:04.53	Q
3	4	Klaudia Nazieblo	Poland	1:04.57	Q
4	3	Sarah Rolko	Luxembourg	1:05.38	
5	1	Madison Wilson	Australia	1:05.54	
6	2	Lourdes Villasenor	Mexico	1:06.29	
7	8	Diana Chang	Ecuador	1:06.37	
8	7	Ting Chen	Chinese Taipei	1:07.32	

=== Heat 5 ===
Rank	Lane	Name	Nationality	Time	Notes
1	3	Alexandra Papusha	Russia	1:02.33	Q
2	4	Bai Anqi	China	1:03.40	Q
3	5	Yukiko Watanabe	Japan	1:04.23	Q
4	7	Juanita Barreto	Colombia	1:04.47	Q
5	6	Dörte Baumert	Germany	1:04.58	Q
6	1	Isabella Arcila	Colombia	1:04.87	Q
7	8	Lotta Nevalainen	Finland	1:04.93	Q
8	2	Monica Ramirez Abella	Andorra	1:05.73	

== Semifinals ==
=== Semifinal 1 ===
Rank	Lane	Name	Nationality	Time	Notes
1	4	Daryna Zevina	Ukraine	1:02.57	Q
2	5	Lovisa Eriksson	Sweden	1:03.48	Q
3	7	Marie Jugnet	France	1:04.02	Q
4	3	Yukiko Watanabe	Japan	1:04.24	
5	2	Dörte Baumert	Germany	1:04.36	
6	6	Allison Roberts	South Africa	1:04.55	
7	1	Isabella Arcila	Colombia	1:04.98	
8	8	Renee Stothard	New Zealand	1:05.11	

=== Semifinal 2 ===
Rank	Lane	Name	Nationality	Time	Notes
1	5	Bai Anqi	China	1:02.33	Q
2	4	Alexandra Papusha	Russia	1:02.62	Q
3	2	Klaudia Nazieblo	Poland	1:03.57	Q
4	3	Ida Lindborg	Sweden	1:03.99	Q
5	7	Yulduz Kuchkarova	Uzbekistan	1:04.03	Q
6	6	Juanita Barreto	Colombia	1:04.64	
7	1	Martina Elhenicka	Czech Republic	1:05.43	
8	8	Lotta Nevalainen	Finland	1:05.96	

== Final ==
Rank	Lane	Name	Nationality	Time	Notes
1st place, gold medalist(s)	4	Daryna Zevina	Ukraine	1:01.51	
2nd place, silver medalist(s)	5	Bay Anqi	China	1:01.97	
3rd place, bronze medalist(s)	3	Alexandra Papusha	Russia	1:02.15	
4	2	Klaudia Nazieblo	Poland	1:03.07	
5	6	Lovisa Eriksson	Sweden	1:03.40	
6	7	Ida Lindborg	Sweden	1:03.60	
7	1	Marie Jugnet	France	1:03.65	
8	8	Yulduz Kuchkarova	Uzbekistan	1:04.46	
