= Myanmar at the 2010 Summer Youth Olympics =

- IOC code: MYA
- NOC: Myanmar Olympic Committee

in Singapore
- Competitors: 4 in 4 sports
- Flag bearer: Aung Gyi
- Medals: Gold 0 Silver 0 Bronze 0 Total 0

Summer Youth Olympics appearances
- 2010; 2014; 2018; 2026

Myanmar competed at the 2010 Summer Youth Olympics, the inaugural Youth Olympic Games, held in Singapore from 14 August to 26 August 2010.

== Archery ==
Boys

| Athlete | Event | Ranking Round | | Round of 32 | Round of 16 | Quarterfinals | Semifinals | Final | |
| Athlete | Event | Score | Seed | Opposition Score | Opposition Score | Opposition Score | Opposition Score | Opposition Score | Rank |
|---|---|---|---|---|---|---|---|---|---|
| Aung Gyi | Boys’ Individual | 412 | 31 | Min Beom Park (KOR); L 0-6 | Did not advance | | | | 17 |

Mixed Team

| Athlete | Event | Partner | Round of 32 | Round of 16 | Quarterfinals | Semifinals | Final | |
| Athlete | Event | Partner | Opposition Score | Opposition Score | Opposition Score | Opposition Score | Opposition Score | Rank |
|---|---|---|---|---|---|---|---|---|
| Aung Gyi | Mixed Team | Ye Ji Kwak (KOR) | Gloria Filippi (ITA)/ Anton Karoukin (BLR); L 0-6 | Did not advance | | | | 17 |

== Athletics ==
=== Girls ===
Track and Road Events

| Athletes | Event | Qualification | | Final | |
| Athletes | Event | Result | Rank | Result | Rank |
|---|---|---|---|---|---|
| Swe Li Myint Myint | Girls’ 1000m | 3:09.92 | 21 qB | 3:09.58 | 24 |

== Taekwondo ==
| Athlete | Event | Preliminary | Quarterfinal | Semifinal | Final | Rank |
|---|---|---|---|---|---|---|
| Naing Dwe Shein Shein | Boys' -55kg | Thierry Mabounda (CGO); W 5-4 | Jia Jun Daryl Tan (SIN); L 5-6 | Did not advance | | 5 |

== Weightlifting ==
| Athlete | Event | Snatch | Clean & jerk | Total | Rank |
|---|---|---|---|---|---|
| Kay Khine Khine | Girls' 48kg | 55 | 65 | 120 | 7 |
