= Weightlifting at the 2010 Summer Youth Olympics – Boys' 56 kg =

Boys' 56 at the I Summer Youth Olympic Games
- Venue: Toa Payoh Sports Hall
- Dates: August 15, 2010
- Competitors: 11 from 11 nations
- Winning total weight: 256kg

Medalists
1st place, gold medalist(s)		Thạch Kim Tuấn	Vietnam
2nd place, silver medalist(s)		Xie Jiawu	China
3rd place, bronze medalist(s)		Smbat Margaryan	Armenia

The boys' 56 kg weightlifting event was the first men's event at the weightlifting competition at the 2010 Summer Youth Olympics, with competitors limited to a maximum of 56 kilograms of body mass. The whole competition took place on August 15 at 18:00.

Each lifter performed in both the snatch and clean and jerk lifts, with the final score being the sum of the lifter's best result in each. The athlete received three attempts in each of the two lifts; the score for the lift was the heaviest weight successfully lifted.

== Results ==
Rank	Name	Group	Body Weight	Snatch (kg)				Clean & Jerk (kg)				Total (kg)
Rank	Name	Group	Body Weight	1	2	3	Res	1	2	3	Res	Total (kg)
1st place, gold medalist(s)	Thạch Kim Tuấn (VIE)	A	55.40	110	~~114~~	116	116	134	~~139~~	140	140	256
2nd place, silver medalist(s)	Xie Jiawu (CHN)	A	55.83	108	113	117	117	132	137	~~140~~	137	254
3rd place, bronze medalist(s)	Smbat Margaryan (ARM)	A	55.95	~~105~~	105	108	108	135	~~149~~	~~149~~	135	243
4	Artjoms Žerebkovs (LAT)	A	55.67	94	~~98~~	98	98	122	127	128	128	226
5	Florin Croitoru (ROU)	A	55.63	98	~~103~~	103	103	119	122	~~125~~	122	225
6	Juan Prado (VEN)	A	55.85	~~98~~	98	100	100	~~118~~	118	~~123~~	118	218
7	Ygtyýar Matkarimow (TKM)	A	55.41	90	~~95~~	95	95	110	115	120	120	215
8	Karem Ben Hnia (TUN)	A	55.31	91	~~96~~	96	96	118	~~122~~	~~122~~	118	214
9	Elson Brechtefeld (NRU)	A	55.56	87	~~92~~	92	92	113	~~117~~	117	117	209
10	Phello John Ramela (RSA)	A	55.76	85	~~90~~	~~90~~	85	100	~~105~~	~~105~~	100	185
11	Amon Shiro (MHL)	A	53.57	45	55	~~60~~	55	55	~~65~~	65	65	120
