= Sameer Verma =

Indian badminton player (born 1994)

Personal information
- Born: 22 October 1994 (age 32) Dhar, Madhya Pradesh, India
- Height: 1.70 m (5 ft 7 in)
- Weight: 60 kg (132 lb)

Sport
- Country: India
- Sport: Badminton
- Handedness: Right
- Coached by: Pullela Gopichand

Men's singles
- Highest ranking: 11 (22 January 2019)
- Current ranking: 95 (27 August 2024)
- BWF profile
Medal record
Men's badminton
Representing India
World Junior Championships
Bronze medal – third place	2011 Taipei	Boys' singles
Commonwealth Youth Games
Silver medal – second place	2011 Douglas	Boys' singles
Asian Junior Championships
Silver medal – second place	2011 Lucknow	Boys' singles
Bronze medal – third place	2011 Lucknow	Mixed team
Bronze medal – third place	2012 Gimcheon	Boys' singles

Sameer Verma (born 22 October 1994) is an Indian badminton player. He trains at the Gopichand Badminton Academy, Hyderabad. Sameer is the brother of Indian badminton player Sourabh Verma.

== Career ==
=== 2011 ===
Verma won a silver medal in the boys singles and a bronze in the mixed team event in the Asian Junior Championships, held in Lucknow, India. He also won silver at the men's singles at the 2011 Commonwealth Youth Games, losing in the final to Zulfadli Zulkiffli of Malaysia. He also secured a bronze medal in World Junior Championships in the boys' singles category.

=== 2012 ===
At the 36th Junior National Badminton Championships in Jaipur, Verma won the boys' singles U-19 category. The same year Verma also reached the final of the Iran Fajr International. He also secured a bronze medal in Asian Junior Championships held in Gimcheon, South Korea in the boys' singles category. He had a world rank #3 in Junior boys' singles.

=== 2013 ===
In 2013, Verma won his first international titles, the men's singles event at the Bahrain International Series and Bahrain International Challenge.

=== 2014 ===
Battling injuries in 2012 and 2013, Verma came back strongly in 2014 by winning the All India Senior Ranking Badminton Championships, in Bareilly. He also bagged the Bahrain International Challenge title defeating Subhankar Dey in a thrilling three setter finals. He also added another title to his name by won the Bahrain International Series against Dinuka Karunaratne in a 1-hour three setter match.

=== 2015 ===
Verma grabbed three major titles in the men's singles category including Tata Open International Challenge held at Mumbai, India, Bahrain International Challenge and Bahrain International Series. He was the runner-up in the Bangladesh and Sri Lanka International Challenge and also a semi-finalist in the Bulgaria International Challenge tournament.

=== 2016 ===
Verma defeated world No. 3 Jan Ø. Jørgensen in straight games to storm into the final of the Hong Kong Open Super Series. In the final, he lost to host player, Ng Ka Long, in straight games.

=== 2017 ===
Verma won the Syed Modi International in January 2017 defeating B. Sai Praneeth 21–19 21–16 in the final. He beat the higher ranked Hans-Kristian Vittinghus in the quarter-finals of the same tournament.

=== 2018 ===
In 2018, Verma won the Swiss Open title beating Jan Ø. Jørgensen (21–15, 21–13) in the final. Later in the year he also won the Hyderabad Open a Super 100 event, before defending his title in November beating Lu Guangzu by 16–21, 21–19, 21–14 at the Syed Modi International. With his title finish at his home Super 300 event, he confirmed his qualification for the World Tour Finals, in Guangzhou, standing at the 7th position in the qualification list and where only the top 8 most consistent players across all five disciplines are allowed to compete for the year end finale crown and win a share of $1.5 million. He played the semi-finals of the World Tour Finals as the first Indian male badminton player to secure a position in the World Tour Finals tournament. He stunned Tommy Sugiarto and Kantaphon Wangcharoen in straight sets in the group stage. Verma lost the hard-fought semi-finals against Shi Yuqi of China after leading on match-point in the second set. The thrilling match lasted for an hour and eight minutes, the scores being 21–12, 20–22 and 17–21.

== Achievements ==
=== World Junior Championships ===
Boys' singles
Year	Venue	Opponent	Score	Result
2011	Taoyuan Arena, Taoyuan City, Taipei, Taiwan	(Denmark) Viktor Axelsen	19–21, 19–21	Bronze

=== Commonwealth Youth Games ===
Boys' singles
Year	Venue	Opponent	Score	Result
2011	National Sports Centre, Douglas, Isle of Man	(Malaysia) Zulfadli Zulkiffli	16–21, 21–17, 15–21	Silver

=== Asian Junior Championships ===
Boys' singles
Year	Venue	Opponent	Score	Result
2011	Babu Banarasi Das Indoor Stadium, Lucknow, India	(Malaysia) Zulfadli Zulkiffli	15–21, 17–21	Silver
2012	Gimcheon Indoor Stadium, Gimcheon, South Korea	(Japan) Kento Momota	21–13, 18–21, 9–21	Bronze

=== BWF World Tour (3 titles) ===
The BWF World Tour, which was announced on 19 March 2017 and implemented in 2018, is a series of elite badminton tournaments sanctioned by the Badminton World Federation (BWF). The BWF World Tours are divided into levels of World Tour Finals, Super 1000, Super 750, Super 500, Super 300 (part of the HSBC World Tour), and the BWF Tour Super 100.

Men's singles
Year	Tournament	Level	Opponent	Score	Result
2018	Swiss Open	Super 300	(Denmark) Jan Ø. Jørgensen	21–15, 21–13	(gold) Winner
2018	Hyderabad Open	Super 100	(Malaysia) Soong Joo Ven	21–15, 21–18	(gold) Winner
2018	Syed Modi International	Super 300	(China) Lu Guangzu	16–21, 21–19, 21–14	(gold) Winner

=== BWF Superseries (1 runner-up) ===
The BWF Superseries, which was launched on 14 December 2006 and implemented in 2007, was a series of elite badminton tournaments, sanctioned by the Badminton World Federation (BWF). BWF Superseries levels were Superseries and Superseries Premier. A season of Superseries consisted of twelve tournaments around the world that had been introduced since 2011. Successful players were invited to the Superseries Finals, which were held at the end of each year.

Men's singles
Year	Tournament	Opponent	Score	Result
2016	Hong Kong Open	(Hong Kong) Ng Ka Long	14–21, 21–10, 11–21	(silver) Runner-up

BWF Super Series Finals tournament
BWF Super Series Premier tournament
BWF Super Series tournament

=== BWF Grand Prix (1 title) ===
The BWF Grand Prix had two levels, the Grand Prix and Grand Prix Gold. It was a series of badminton tournaments sanctioned by the Badminton World Federation (BWF) and played between 2007 and 2017.

Men's singles
Year	Tournament	Opponent	Score	Result
2017	Syed Modi International	(India) B. Sai Praneeth	21–19, 21–16	(gold) Winner

BWF Grand Prix Gold tournament
BWF Grand Prix tournament

=== BWF International Challenge/Series (6 titles, 4 runners-up) ===
Men's singles
Year	Tournament	Opponent	Score	Result
2012	Iran Fajr International	(Sri Lanka) Niluka Karunaratne	18–21, 15–21	(silver) Runner-up
2013	Bahrain International	(Sri Lanka) Dinuka Karunaratna	21–11, 18–21, 21–13	(gold) Winner
2013	Bahrain International Challenge	(India) Subhankar Dey	19–21, 21–14, 21–12	(gold) Winner
2015	Sri Lanka International	(India) B. Sai Praneeth	18–21, 8–21	(silver) Runner-up
2015	Bahrain International	(India) Pratul Joshi	21–13, 18–21, 21–8	(gold) Winner
2015	Bahrain International Challenge	(Singapore) Derek Wong	21–14, 21–10	(gold) Winner
2015	Bangladesh International	(India) B. Sai Praneeth	14–21, 21–8, 17–21	(silver) Runner-up
2015	Tata India International	(India) Sourabh Varma	21–11, 21–18	(gold) Winner
2023	Slovenia Open	(Chinese Taipei) Su Li-yang	21–18, 21–14	(gold) Winner
2024	Azerbaijan International	(South Korea) Jeon Hyeok-jin	21–13, 3–6 retired	(silver) Runner-up

BWF International Challenge tournament
BWF International Series tournament
BWF Future Series tournament

== Personal ==
Verma hails from a sport-loving family. His parents live in Dhar district in Madhya Pradesh. He followed in the footsteps of his brother Sourabh Varma, who is also an internationally ranked badminton player, and took up badminton as a sport at a very young age. He soon moved to the Gopichand Badminton Academy in Hyderabad to train under coach and former Indian player Pullela Gopichand.

== Awards ==
He has been awarded the Vikram Award in the year 2016 for badminton by Madhya Pradesh. He has also been the recipient for the Eklavya Award in 2009 for badminton by Madhya Pradesh. Additionally, Sameer Verma has been nominated for the Sportsman of the Year in Racquet Sport (2018) at the Sportstar Aces Awards supported by Supreme Committee of Delivery and Legacy and Emerging Sportsman of the Year by Indian Sports Honors (2017), Organised by Virat Kohli Foundation.
