= Zulfadli Zulkiffli =

Malaysian badminton player (born 1993)

Personal information
- Born: Zulfadli bin Zulkiffli; 11 February 1993 (age 33) Los Angeles, California, United States
- Height: 1.78 m (5 ft 10 in)
- Weight: 72 kg (159 lb)

Sport
- Country: Malaysia
- Sport: Badminton
- Handedness: Right

Men's singles
- Highest ranking: 30 (26 January 2017)
- BWF profile
Medal record
Men's badminton
Representing Malaysia
Summer Universiade
Bronze medal – third place	2015 Gwangju	Mixed team
Bronze medal – third place	2017 Taipei	Mixed team
World Junior Championships
Gold medal – first place	2011 Taipei	Boys' singles
Gold medal – first place	2011 Taipei	Mixed team
Silver medal – second place	2009 Alor Setar	Mixed team
Bronze medal – third place	2010 Guadalajara	Mixed team
Commonwealth Youth Games
Gold medal – first place	2011 Douglas	Boys' singles
Asian Junior Championships
Gold medal – first place	2009 Kuala Lumpur	Mixed team
Gold medal – first place	2011 Lucknow	Boys' singles
Silver medal – second place	2010 Kuala Lumpur	Mixed team
Silver medal – second place	2011 Lucknow	Mixed team
Bronze medal – third place	2010 Kuala Lumpur	Boys' singles

Zulfadli bin Zulkiffli (born 11 February 1993) is a Malaysian badminton player. He was the boys' singles gold medalist at the 2011 Asian and World Junior Championships, also at the Commonwealth Youth Games.

In 2018, Zulkiffli was found guilty by the Badminton World Federation and barred from all badminton-related activities for 20 years over match fixing violations.

== Achievements ==
=== World Junior Championships ===
Boys' singles
Year	Venue	Opponent	Score	Result
2011	Taoyuan Arena, Taoyuan City; Taipei, Taiwan	(Denmark) Viktor Axelsen	21–18, 9–21, 21–19	Gold

=== Commonwealth Youth Games ===
Boys' singles
Year	Venue	Opponent	Score	Result
2011	National Sports Centre; Douglas, Isle of Man	(India) Sameer Verma	21–16, 17–21, 21–15	Gold

=== Asian Junior Championships ===
Boys' singles
Year	Venue	Opponent	Score	Result
2010	Stadium Juara; Kuala Lumpur, Malaysia	(China) Huang Yuxiang	16–21, 12–21	Bronze
2011	Babu Banarasi Das Indoor Stadium; Lucknow, India	(India) Sameer Verma	21–15, 21–17	Gold

=== BWF Grand Prix ===
The BWF Grand Prix has two levels, the BWF Grand Prix and Grand Prix Gold. It is a series of badminton tournaments sanctioned by the Badminton World Federation (BWF) since 2007.

Men's singles
Year	Tournament	Opponent	Score	Result
2016	Brasil Open	(India) Anand Pawar	18–21, 21–11, 21–17	(gold) Winner
2016	Russian Open	(India) Siril Verma	16–21, 21–19, 21–10	(gold) Winner

BWF Grand Prix Gold tournament
BWF Grand Prix tournament

=== BWF International Challenge/Series ===
Men's singles
Year	Tournament	Opponent	Score	Result
2012	Maldives International	(India) Srikanth Kidambi	21–13, 11–21, 16–21	(silver) Runner-up
2015	Sydney International	(Vietnam) Nguyễn Tiến Minh	11–21, 12–21	(silver) Runner-up

BWF International Challenge tournament
BWF International Series tournament
