= Kang Ji-wook =

South Korean badminton player

Personal information
- Born: 7 July 1992 (age 34) Jeju, South Korea
- Height: 1.77 m (5 ft 10 in)

Sport
- Country: South Korea
- Sport: Badminton

Men's & mixed doubles
- Highest ranking: 31 (MD 12 September 2013); 54 (XD 16 January 2014)
- BWF profile
Medal record
Men's badminton
Representing South Korea
Asian Championships
Bronze medal – third place	2012 Qingdao	Mixed doubles
Youth Olympic Games
Bronze medal – third place	2010 Singapore	Boys' singles
World Junior Championships
Silver medal – second place	2007 Waitakere City	Mixed team
Silver medal – second place	2008 Pune	Mixed team
Silver medal – second place	2010 Guadalajara	Boys' singles
Silver medal – second place	2010 Guadalajara	Mixed doubles
Silver medal – second place	2010 Guadalajara	Mixed team
Asian Junior Championships
Gold medal – first place	2010 Kuala Lumpur	Boys' doubles
Silver medal – second place	2008 Kuala Lumpur	Mixed team
Bronze medal – third place	2009 Kuala Lumpur	Boys' doubles

- Kang Ji-wook
- Hangul: 강지욱
- RR: Gang Jiuk
- MR: Kang Chiuk

Kang Ji-wook (Korean: 강지욱; born 7 July 1992) is a South Korean badminton player. He first came to international attention when he became the runner-up in three different events at the 2010 BWF World Junior Championships. He won the silver medal in the boys' singles, mixed doubles and mixed team event. He also won the gold medal in the boys' doubles event at the 2010 Asian Junior Badminton Championships, and at the same year, he competed at the Singapore Summer Youth Olympics where he won the boys' singles bronze.

== Achievements ==
=== Asian Championships ===
Mixed doubles
Year	Venue	Partner	Opponent	Score	Result
2012	Qingdao Sports Centre Conson Stadium; Qingdao, China	(South Korea) Eom Hye-won	(China) Xu Chen (China) Ma Jin	14–21, 12–21	Bronze

=== Youth Olympic Games ===
Boys' singles
Year	Venue	Opponent	Score	Result
2010	Singapore Indoor Stadium, Singapore	(Malaysia) Loh Wei Sheng	Walkover	Bronze

=== BWF World Junior Championships ===
Boys' singles
Year	Venue	Opponent	Score	Result
2010	Domo del Code Jalisco, Guadalajara, Mexico	(Denmark) Viktor Axelsen	19–21, 10–21	Silver

Mixed doubles
Year	Venue	Partner	Opponent	Score	Result
2010	Domo del Code Jalisco; Guadalajara, Mexico	(South Korea) Choi Hye-in	(China) Liu Cheng (China) Bao Yixin	15–21, 15–21	Silver

=== Asia Junior Championships ===
Boys' doubles
Year	Venue	Partner	Opponent	Score	Result
2009	Stadium Juara; Kuala Lumpur, Malaysia	(South Korea) Choi Seung-il	(Malaysia) Ow Yao Han (Malaysia) Yew Hong Kheng	17–21, 21–8, 16–21	Bronze
2010	Stadium Juara; Kuala Lumpur, Malaysia	(South Korea) Choi Seung-il	(Malaysia) Ow Yao Han (Malaysia) Yew Hong Kheng	21–16, 21–14	Gold

=== BWF Grand Prix ===
The BWF Grand Prix had two levels, the BWF Grand Prix and Grand Prix Gold. It was a series of badminton tournaments sanctioned by the Badminton World Federation (BWF) which was held from 2007 to 2017.

Men's doubles
Year	Tournament	Partner	Opponent	Score	Result
2012	India Grand Prix Gold	(South Korea) Lee Sang-joon	(South Korea) Ko Sung-hyun (South Korea) Lee Yong-dae	13–21, 19–21	(silver) Runner-up

Mixed doubles
Year	Tournament	Partner	Opponent	Score	Result
2013	Korea Grand Prix Gold	(South Korea) Choi Hye-in	(South Korea) Yoo Yeon-seong (South Korea) Jang Ye-na	13–21, 11–21	(silver) Runner-up

BWF Grand Prix Gold tournament
BWF Grand Prix tournament

=== BWF International Challenge/Series ===
Mixed doubles
Year	Tournament	Partner	Opponent	Score	Result
2011	Vietnam International	(South Korea) Choi Hye-in	(Thailand) Patiphat Chalardchalaem (Thailand) Savitree Amitapai	19–21, 22–20, 21–23	(silver) Runner-up

BWF International Challenge tournament
BWF International Series tournament
