= Huang Chao (badminton) =

Chinese-born Singaporean badminton player

Huang Chao 黄超
Personal information
- Born: 30 June 1992 (age 34) Jingzhou, Hubei, China
- Height: 1.84 m (6 ft 0 in)

Sport
- Country: Singapore
- Sport: Badminton
- Handedness: Right

Men's singles
- Highest ranking: 121 (10 June 2011)
- BWF profile
Medal record
Men's badminton
Representing Singapore
Commonwealth Games
Bronze medal – third place	2014 Glasgow	Mixed team
Southeast Asian Games
Bronze medal – third place	2009 Vientiane	Men's team
Bronze medal – third place	2011 Jakarta–Palembang	Men's team

Huang Chao (Chinese: 黄超; born 30 June 1992) is a Singaporean former badminton player. He is a one-time national champion.

== Early life ==
Huang was born in Jingzhou, Hubei, China, and joined the Singapore Badminton Association (SBA) on the Foreign Sports Talent Scheme in 2004 when he was 12 years old. The three-time provincial junior champion, whose father Huang Kai was a national player for China in the 1980s.

== Career ==
In 2010, Huang was Singapore's lone badminton representative at the inaugural Youth Olympic Games. He made it to the quarter-finals, upsetting India's second seed B. Sai Praneeth along the way.

Huang was part of the squad who won men's team bronzes at the 2009 and 2011 Southeast Asian Games. He is a former national champion, having won the men's singles title at the 2013 edition.

In 2011, Huang reached his career high ranking of 121.

Huang also played a part in the mixed team bronze at 2014's Glasgow Commonwealth Games.

Huang retired from the Singapore national badminton team on 1 September 2015 due to shoulder injury. He is expected to remain in Singapore and has not ruled out the possibility of working with the Singapore Badminton Association in the future.

In 2019, Huang came out of retirement to try for a place in the 2019 SEA Games.

== Personal life ==
Huang became a Singapore citizen in 2010.

== Achievements ==
- 2009
  - Laos SEA Games Men's team - 3rd
- 2011
  - Indonesia SEA Games Men's team - 3rd
- 2014
  - Glasgow Commonwealth Games Mixed team - 3rd
