= Pisit Poodchalat =

Thai badminton player (born 1992)

Personal information
- Born: 20 February 1992 (age 34)

Sport
- Country: Thailand
- Sport: Badminton

Men's singles &doubles
- Highest ranking: 79 (MS 26 September 2013); 251 (MD 22 August 2013); 147 (XD 18 July 2013)
- BWF profile
Medal record
Men's badminton
Representing Thailand
Summer Universiade
Bronze medal – third place	2013 Kazan	Mixed team
SEA Games
Bronze medal – third place	2011 Jakarta	Men's team
Youth Olympic Games
Gold medal – first place	2010 Singapore	Boys' singles
World Junior Championships
Bronze medal – third place	2009 Alor Setar	Mixed team
Asian Junior Championships
Bronze medal – third place	2009 Kuala Lumpur	Mixed team
Bronze medal – third place	2010 Kuala Lumpur	Mixed doubles
Bronze medal – third place	2010 Kuala Lumpur	Mixed team

Pisit Poodchalat (Thai: พิสิษฐ์ พูดฉลาด; born 20 February 1992) is a Thai badminton player. He was the boys' singles gold medalist at the 2010 Summer Youth Olympics in Singapore. Poodchalat claimed the men's singles title at the 2012 National Championships beating Sitthikom Thammasin in straight games with the score 21–19, 21–15. He also competed at the 2013 Summer Universiade in Kazan, Russia, winning a bronze medal in the mixed team event.

== Achievements ==
=== Youth Olympic Games ===
Boys' singles
Year	Venue	Opponent	Score	Result
2010	Singapore Indoor Stadium, Singapore	(India) Prannoy Kumar	21–15, 21–16	Gold

=== Asian Junior Championships ===
Mixed doubles
Year	Venue	Partner	Opponent	Score	Result
2010	Stadium Juara, Kuala Lumpur, Malaysia	(Thailand) Narissapat Lam	(China) Liu Cheng (China) Bao Yixin	16–21, 11–21	Bronze

=== BWF International Challenge/Series ===
Men's singles
Year	Tournament	Opponent	Score	Result
2013	Victoria International	(Chinese Taipei) Yu Chun-hsien	21–5, 21–5	(gold) Winner

Mixed doubles
Year	Tournament	Partner	Opponent	Score	Result
2008	Laos International	(Thailand) Ratchanok Intanon	(Vietnam) Dương Bảo Đức (Vietnam) Thái Thị Hồng Gấm	16–21, 21–18, 17–21	(silver) Runner-up

BWF International Challenge tournament
BWF International Series tournament
BWF Future Series tournament
