= Nick Fransman =

Dutch badminton player (born 1992)

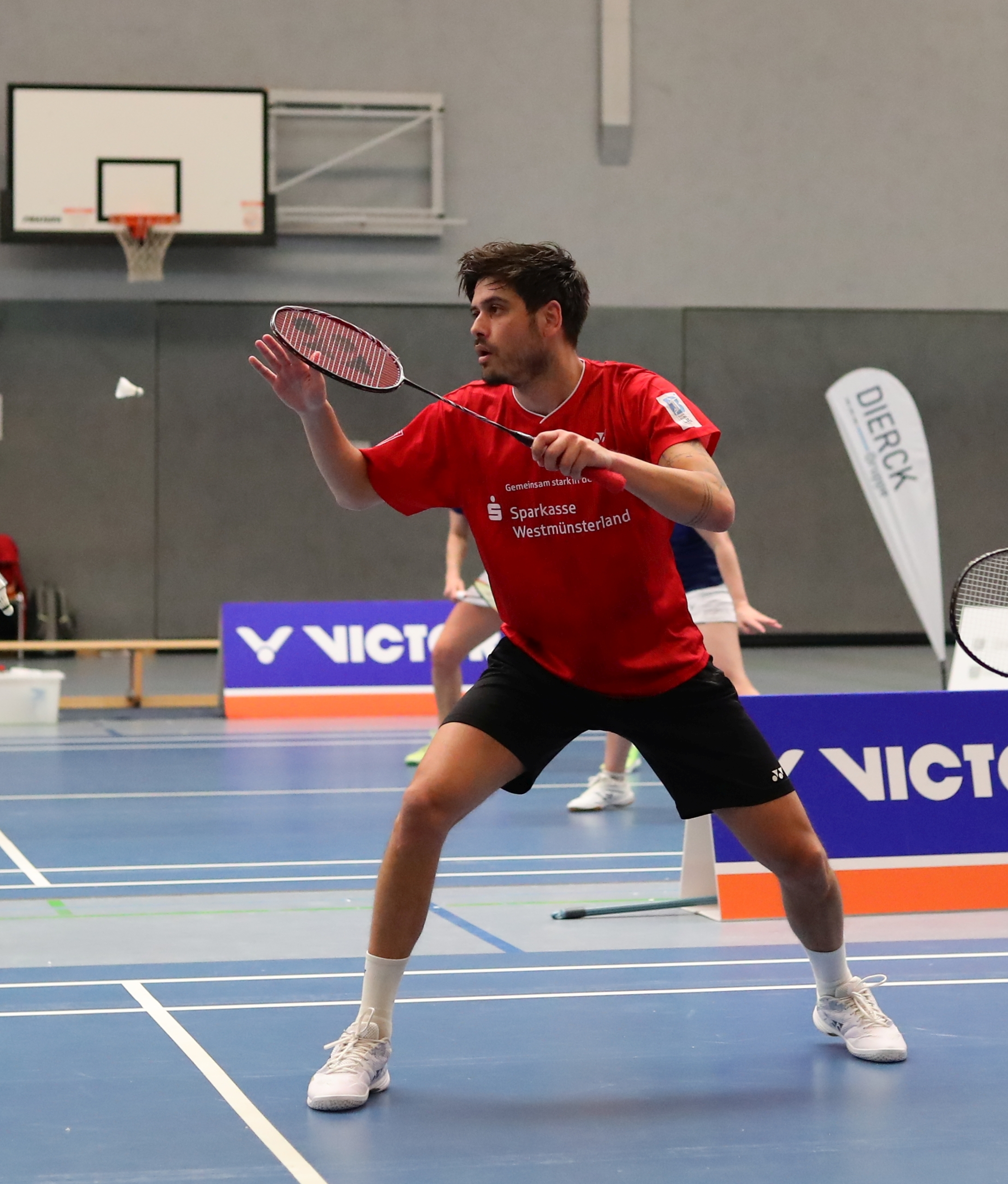
- Fransman in 2026

Personal information
- Born: 28 February 1992 (age 34)
- Height: 1.85 m (6 ft 1 in)

Sport
- Country: Netherlands
- Sport: Badminton
- Handedness: Left
- Coached by: Jonas Lyduch

Men's singles
- Highest ranking: 77 (23 March 2017)
- BWF profile
Medal record
Men's badminton
Representing Netherlands
European Mixed Team Championships
Bronze medal – third place	2019 Copenhagen	Mixed team
European Men's Team Championships
Silver medal – second place	2020 Liévin	Men's team
European Junior Championships
Silver medal – second place	2009 Milan	Mixed team

Nick Fransman (born 28 February 1992) is a Dutch badminton player. Plays for BC Smashing in Wijchen, he won the 2009 national junior titles in singles, men's doubles and mixed doubles. Fransman represented his country compete at the 2010 Summer Youth Olympics. He was runner-up at the National Championships in 2015, 2017 and 2018.

== Achievements ==
=== BWF International Challenge/Series ===
Men's singles
Year	Tournament	Opponent	Score	Result
2014	Turkey International	(Austria) Matthias Almer	15–21, 21–7, 17–21	(silver) Runner-up
2015	Croatian International	(Netherlands) Eric Pang	16–21, 12–21	(silver) Runner-up

BWF International Challenge tournament
BWF International Series tournament
BWF Future Series tournament
