= Prannoy H. S. =

Indian badminton player (born 1992)

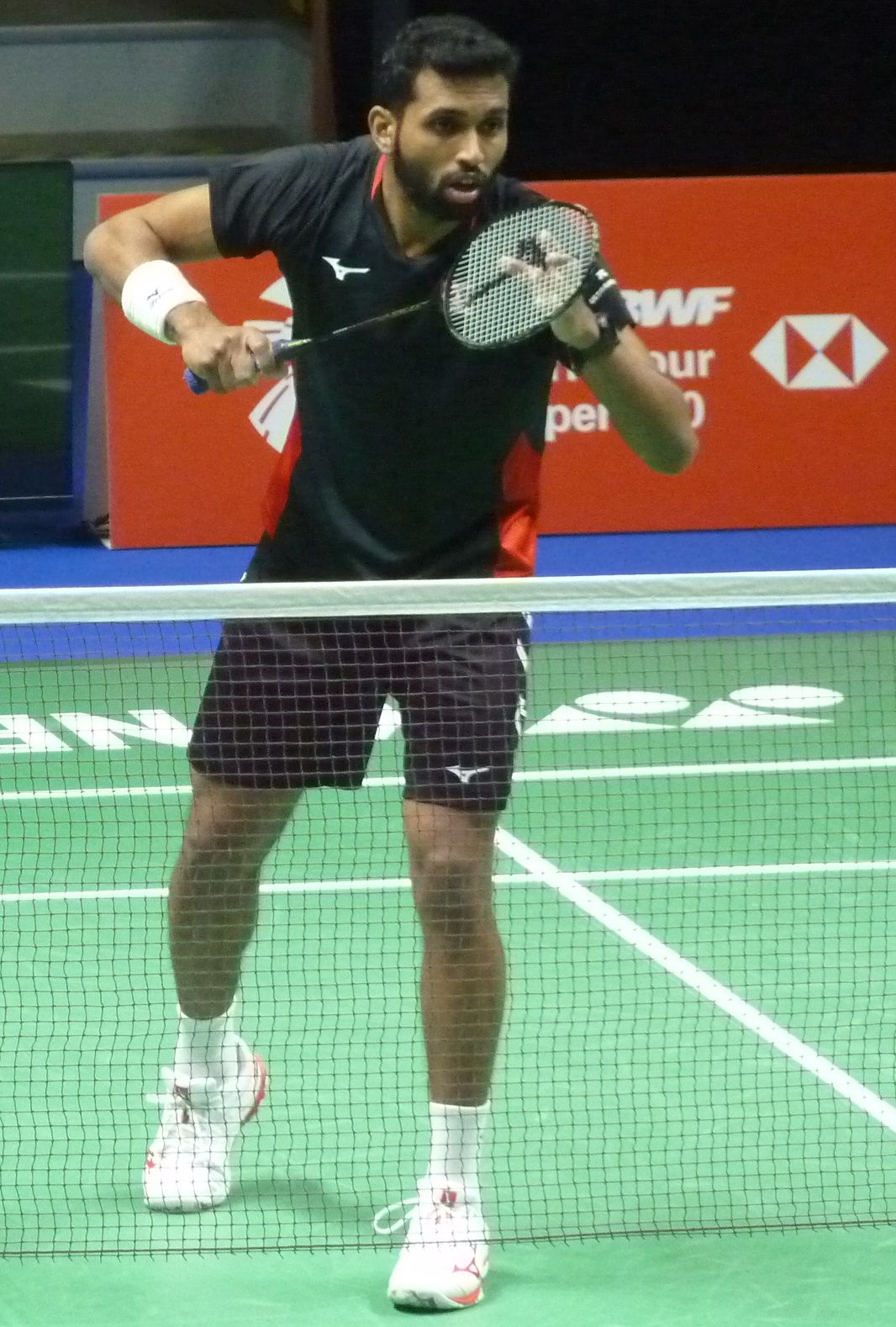
- Prannoy in 2022

Personal information
- Born: Prannoy Haseena Sunil Kumar; 17 July 1992 (age 34) Delhi, India
- Height: 1.79 m (5 ft 10 in)
- Weight: 73 kg (161 lb)

Sport
- Country: India
- Sport: Badminton
- Handedness: Right
- Coached by: Pullela Gopichand

Men's singles
- Career record: 285 wins, 195 losses
- Highest ranking: 6 (29 August 2023)
- Current ranking: 39 (10 November 2026)
- BWF profile
Medal record
Men's badminton
Representing India
World Championships
Bronze medal – third place	2023 Copenhagen	Men's singles
Thomas Cup
Gold medal – first place	2022 Bangkok	Men's team
Bronze medal – third place	2026 Horsens	Men's team
Commonwealth Games
Gold medal – first place	2018 Gold Coast	Mixed team
Asian Games
Silver medal – second place	2022 Hangzhou	Men's team
Bronze medal – third place	2022 Hangzhou	Men's singles
Bronze medal – third place	2026 Aichi–Nagoya	Men's team
Asian Championships
Bronze medal – third place	2018 Wuhan	Men's singles
Asia Mixed Team Championships
Bronze medal – third place	2023 Dubai	Mixed team
Asia Team Championships
Bronze medal – third place	2016 Hyderabad	Men's team
Bronze medal – third place	2020 Manila	Men's team
South Asian Games
Gold medal – first place	2016 Guwahati–Shillong	Men's team
Silver medal – second place	2016 Guwahati–Shillong	Men's singles
Youth Olympic Games
Silver medal – second place	2010 Singapore	Boys' singles
World Junior Championships
Bronze medal – third place	2010 Guadalajara	Boys' singles

Prannoy Haseena Sunil Kumar (born 17 July 1992), also known as H. S. Prannoy, is an Indian badminton player who currently trains at the Gopichand Badminton Academy in Hyderabad. He has won bronze medals at the 2023 World Championships and at the 2022 Asian Games. Prannoy was part of India winning team at the 2018 Commonwealth Games and 2022 Thomas Cup. He originally hails from Thiruvananthapuram and has a career-high world ranking of number 6, which he attained in August 2023. He studied at Kendriya Vidyalaya Akkulam.

== Career ==
=== Early career ===
Prannoy came to prominence after winning the silver medal in the boys' singles at the 2010 Summer Youth Olympics. He followed it up with another silver, this time at the Bahrain International Challenge, in 2011. However, as he struggled for form and injuries, Prannoy endured a somewhat barren spell following these achievements.

=== 2013 ===
In 2013, Prannoy managed to reach the final of the Tata Open International Challenge in Mumbai, eventually losing to compatriot Sourabh Verma in the final.

=== 2014 ===
In 2014, Prannoy claimed two All India Senior National Ranking Championships: Manorama Indian Open All India Senior Ranking Badminton Tournament, Kerala and the V. V. Natu Memorial All India Senior Ranking Badminton Tournament, Pune. However, it was his exploits on the international circuit that caught everyone's attention. He was a semi-finalist at the 2014 India Open Grand Prix Gold, Bitburger Open Grand Prix Gold,2014 Macau Open Grand Prix Gold and the Sri Lanka Open International Badminton Challenge in Colombo.

Prannoy surprised one and all by reaching the final of the 2014 Vietnam Open Grand Prix where he lost to top seed and tournament favourite Dionysius Hayom Rumbaka of Indonesia. In the very next tournament, the Indonesia Open Grand Prix Gold, Prannoy went one better, this time beating local favourite Firman Abdul Kholik of Indonesia in straight sets. He managed to end the year as the third-highest ranked Indian at World no. 21.

=== 2015 ===
Prannoy started off the year on a good note reaching the semifinals of the 2015 India Open Grand Prix Gold. He put up a spirited performance in the semifinals before bowing out to compatriot Srikanth Kidambi in 3 sets. His greatest victory came in the pre-quarters of the 2015 India Super Series, when he beat an in-form world number 2 Jan Ø. Jørgensen in 3 sets. He played his heart out in the quarter-finals as well, but ultimately suffered defeat to Denmark's Viktor Axelsen.

=== 2016 ===
Prannoy started 2016 on a good note by beating German ace Marc Zwiebler in the finals of the Swiss Open Grand Prix gold 21–18, 21–15.

=== 2017 ===
Prannoy played for the Mumbai Rockets franchise in the 2017 season of the Premier Badminton League. In the 2017 Indonesia Open, he defeated the reigning Olympic silver medalist Lee Chong Wei and the reigning Olympic champion Chen Long in consecutive matches, but lost to Japanese Kazumasa Sakai in the semi-finals. At the 2017 U.S. Open, he defeated Vietnamese Nguyễn Tiến Minh to reach the finals, where he beat compatriot Parupalli Kashyap to win the title.

=== 2018 ===
Prannoy participated in the 2018 Commonwealth Games, where he finished in fourth place after being beaten by Rajiv Ouseph of England in the bronze medal match. He then won a bronze medal at the 2018 Asian Championships, after beating second seed Son Wan-ho in the quarterfinals. However, he was defeated in the semifinal by third seed Chen Long.

=== 2021 ===
Prannoy had a disastrous start to 2021 after exiting in the early rounds of the 2021 Swiss Open and the 2021 All England Open. However, he came back strongly in the second half of the year, most notably defeating reigning Olympic champion Viktor Axelsen in the 2nd round of the 2021 Indonesia Masters in November. He got further success in the 2021 BWF World Championships, held in December, where he upset World no. 9 Ng Ka Long of Hong Kong in the 1st round and World no. 10 Rasmus Gemke in the pre-quarterfinals. He lost to the eventual world champion Loh Kean Yew of Singapore in the quarterfinals. His consistent performances in the last few months of the year enabled him to rise to World no. 27 at the end of the year.

=== 2022 ===
Prannoy was part of the India squad for the 2022 Thomas Cup. In the quarter-final against Malaysia, he won the decider match against Leong Jun Hao to assure India a semi-final spot and its first-ever medal in the Thomas Cup. He repeated this performance in the semi-final against Denmark, beating Rasmus Gemke in the deciding match to take India to the final, which India eventually won.

Prannoy also had a consistent year on the BWF World Tour, reaching six quarterfinals and two semifinals, as well as the quarterfinal of the 2022 BWF World Championships. This enabled him to re-enter the Top 15 in the BWF World Rankings after 4 years. He also qualified for the BWF World Tour Finals for the first time in his career.

== Achievements ==
=== BWF World Championships ===
Men's singles
Year	Venue	Opponent	Score	Result
2023	Royal Arena, Copenhagen, Denmark	(Thailand) Kunlavut Vitidsarn	21–18, 13–21, 14–21	Bronze

=== Asian Games ===
Men's singles
Year	Venue	Opponent	Score	Result
2022	Binjiang Gymnasium, Hangzhou, China	(China) Li Shifeng	16–21, 9–21	Bronze

=== Asian Championships ===
Men's singles
Year	Venue	Opponent	Score	Result
2018	Wuhan Sports Center Gymnasium, Wuhan, China	(China) Chen Long	16–21, 18–21	Bronze

=== South Asian Games ===
Men's singles
Year	Venue	Opponent	Score	Result
2016	Multipurpose Hall SAI–SAG Centre, Shillong, India	(India) Srikanth Kidambi	21–11, 14–21, 6–21	Silver

=== Youth Olympic Games ===
Boys' singles
Year	Venue	Opponent	Score	Result
2010	Singapore Indoor Stadium, Singapore	(Thailand) Pisit Poodchalat	15–21, 16–21	Silver

=== BWF World Junior Championships ===
Boys' singles
Year	Venue	Opponent	Score	Result
2010	Domo del Code Jalisco, Guadalajara, Mexico	(South Korea) Kang Ji-Wook	13–21, 9–21	Bronze

=== BWF World Tour (1 title, 2 runners-up) ===
The BWF World Tour, which was announced on 19 March 2017 and implemented in 2018, is a series of elite badminton tournaments sanctioned by the Badminton World Federation (BWF). The BWF World Tour is divided into levels of World Tour Finals, Super 1000, Super 750, Super 500, Super 300, and the BWF Tour Super 100.

Men's singles
Year	Tournament	Level	Opponent	Score	Result
2022	Swiss Open	Super 300	(Indonesia) Jonatan Christie	12–21, 18–21	(silver) Runner-up
2023	Malaysia Masters	Super 500	(China) Weng Hongyang	21–19, 13–21, 21–18	(gold) Winner
2023	Australian Open	Super 500	(China) Weng Hongyang	9–21, 23–21, 20–22	(silver) Runner-up

=== BWF Grand Prix (3 titles, 1 runner-up) ===
The BWF Grand Prix had two levels, the Grand Prix and Grand Prix Gold. It was a series of badminton tournaments sanctioned by the Badminton World Federation (BWF) and played between 2007 and 2017.

Men's singles
Year	Tournament	Opponent	Score	Result
2014	Vietnam Open	(Indonesia) Dionysius Hayom Rumbaka	21–18, 15–21, 18–21	(silver) Runner-up
2014	Indonesian Masters	(Indonesia) Firman Abdul Kholik	21–11, 22–20	(gold) Winner
2016	Swiss Open	(Germany) Marc Zwiebler	21–18, 21–15	(gold) Winner
2017	U.S. Open	(India) Kashyap Parupalli	21–15, 20–22, 21–12	(gold) Winner

BWF Grand Prix Gold tournament
BWF Grand Prix tournament

=== BWF International Challenge/Series (1 title, 2 runners-up) ===
Men's singles
Year	Tournament	Opponent	Score	Result
2011	Bahrain International	(India) Sourabh Varma	23–25, 12–21	(silver) Runner-up
2013	Tata Open India International	(India) Sourabh Varma	12–21, 17–21	(silver) Runner-up
2014	Tata Open India International	(India) R. M. V. Gurusaidutt	21–16, 20–22, 21–17	(gold) Winner

BWF International Challenge tournament
BWF International Series tournament

== Record against selected opponents ==
Record against Year-end Finals finalists, World Championships semi-finalists, and Olympic quarter-finalists. Accurate as of 31 July 2025.

C	Player	Matches	Won	Lost	Diff.
(China)	Chen Long	6	1	5	–4
(China)	Du Pengyu	1	0	1	–1
(China)	Lin Dan	5	3	2	+1
(China)	Shi Yuqi	9	2	7	–5
(China)	Tian Houwei	1	0	1	–1
(China)	Zhao Junpeng	3	1	2	–1
(Chinese Taipei)	Chou Tien-chen	14	6	8	–2
(Denmark)	Anders Antonsen	4	2	2	0
(Denmark)	Viktor Axelsen	10	3	7	–4
(Denmark)	Jan Ø. Jørgensen	4	4	0	+4
(Denmark)	Hans-Kristian Vittinghus	1	1	0	+1
(England)	Rajiv Ouseph	4	1	3	–2
(India)	Parupalli Kashyap	4	3	1	+2
(India)	Srikanth Kidambi	10	3	7	–4
(India)	B. Sai Praneeth	5	3	2	+1
(India)	Lakshya Sen	8	3	5	–2
(Indonesia)	Anthony Sinisuka Ginting	6	4	2	+2
(Indonesia)	Taufik Hidayat	1	1	0	+1
(Indonesia)	Sony Dwi Kuncoro	3	2	1	+1
(Indonesia)	Tommy Sugiarto	3	3	0	+3
(Japan)	Kento Momota	8	1	7	–6
(Japan)	Kodai Naraoka	7	1	6	–5
(Malaysia)	Lee Chong Wei	5	2	3	–1
(Malaysia)	Liew Daren	12	8	4	+4
(Singapore)	Loh Kean Yew	6	4	2	+2
(South Korea)	Heo Kwang-hee	1	1	0	+1
(South Korea)	Lee Hyun-il	3	1	2	–1
(South Korea)	Son Wan-ho	5	2	3	–1
(Thailand)	Boonsak Ponsana	2	2	0	+2
(Thailand)	Kunlavut Vitidsarn	3	0	3	–3
(Thailand)	Kantaphon Wangcharoen	3	2	1	+1
(Vietnam)	Nguyễn Tiến Minh	2	1	1	0

== See also ==
- Badminton in India
- India national badminton team
