= Alexandru Marin (boxer) =

Romanian boxer (born 1992)

Personal information
- Nickname: The Spartan
- Nationality: Romanian
- Born: March 29, 1992 (age 34) Iași, Romania
- Height: 5 ft 7 in (170 cm)
- Weight: Super flyweight; Bantamweight

Boxing career
- Reach: 68 in (173 cm)
- Stance: Orthodox

Boxing record
- Total fights: 18
- Wins: 18
- Win by KO: 11
- Losses: 0
Medal record
Men's amateur boxing
Representing Romania
Youth World Championships
Bronze medal – third place	2010 Azerbaijan	Bantamweight

Alexandru Marin (born March 29, 1992) is a Romanian professional boxer fighting out of Bethesda, Maryland, United States.

As of June 2019, he is ranked as the world's third best active super flyweight by IBF, and fourth by WBO.

On December 16, 2019, Gideon Buthelezi should have defended his IBO super flyweight title against Marin, who was IBO mandatory challenger. The match did not take place because Marin cited poor health.

== Professional boxing record ==
18 fights	18 wins	0 losses
By knockout	11	0
By decision	7	0

No.	Result	Record	Opponent	Type	Round, time	Date	Location	Notes
18	Win	18–0	(Panama) Luis Concepción	UD	10	May 11, 2019	(United States) EagleBank Arena, Fairfax, Virginia, U.S.	Retained IBO Inter-Continental super flyweight title
17	Win	17–0	(Philippines) Bruno Escalante	SD	10	Sep 8, 2018	(United States) The Forum, Inglewood, California, U.S.	Won vacant IBF Inter-Continental super flyweight title
16	Win	16–0	(United States) Michael Ruiz Jr.	KO	2 (10), 0:44	Apr 14, 2018	(United States) Masonic Temple, Norfolk, Virginia, U.S.	Won vacant IBO Inter-Continental super flyweight title
15	Win	15–0	(Dominican Republic) Juan Medina	UD	8	Nov 4, 2017	(United States) Silver Eagle Gun Arena, Ashburn, Virginia, U.S.	
14	Win	13–0	(Nicaragua) Juan Palacios	TKO	2 (8), 2:21	Aug 12, 2017	(United States) Masonic Temple, Norfolk, Virginia, U.S.	
13	Win	13–0	(Mexico) German Meraz	UD	6	May 20, 2017	(United States) MGM National Harbor, Oxon Hill, Maryland, U.S.	
12	Win	12–0	(United States) Johnny Determan	KO	3 (10), 2:37	Jun 11, 2016	(United States) ABC Sports Complex, Springfield, Virginia, U.S.	Won vacant IBO International bantamweight title
11	Win	11–0	(Puerto Rico) Miguel Del Valle	KO	3 (6), 1:29	Mar 5, 2016	(United States) Masonic Temple, Norfolk, Virginia, U.S.	
10	Win	10–0	(Hungary) Robert Kanalas	TKO	2 (8), 1:58	Jan 16, 2016	(United States) ABC Sports Complex, Springfield, Virginia, U.S.	
9	Win	9–0	(United States) Gabriel Braxton	KO	3 (6), 0:42	Dec 11, 2015	(United States) Banquet Hall, Wellsburg, West Virginia, U.S.	
8	Win	8–0	(United States) Stephon McIntyre	UD	6	Nov 11, 2015	(United States) ABC Sports Complex, Springfield, Virginia, U.S.	
7	Win	7–0	(United States) Nicholas Rodriguez	KO	2 (4), 1:39	Nov 7, 2015	(United States) Beech Activity Center, Wichita, Kansas, U.S.	
6	Win	6–0	(Puerto Rico) Arturo Santiago	UD	6	Mar 14, 2015	(United States) Sphinx Club, Washington, D.C., U.S.	
5	Win	5–0	(United States) Rasool Shakoor	TKO	3 (4), 1:56	Sep 27, 2014	(United States) ABC Sports Complex, Springfield, Virginia, U.S.	
4	Win	4–0	(United States) Darrell Martin	TKO	1 (4), 2:47	May 17, 2014	(United States) NVCC, Annandale, Virginia, U.S.	
3	Win	3–0	(United States) Alex Hipolito	UD	4	Apr 12, 2014	(United States) Patapsco Arena, Baltimore, Maryland, U.S.	
2	Win	2–0	(United States) David Huffman	KO	1 (4), 0:31	Nov 23, 2013	(United States) Patapsco Arena, Baltimore, Maryland, U.S.	
1	Win	1–0	(United States) Jacob Ninow	TKO	2 (4), 2:02	Jun 22, 2013	(United States) Fight Club, Frederick, Maryland, U.S.	
