= Huang Yuxiang =

Chinese badminton player (born 1993)

Huang Yuxiang 黄宇翔
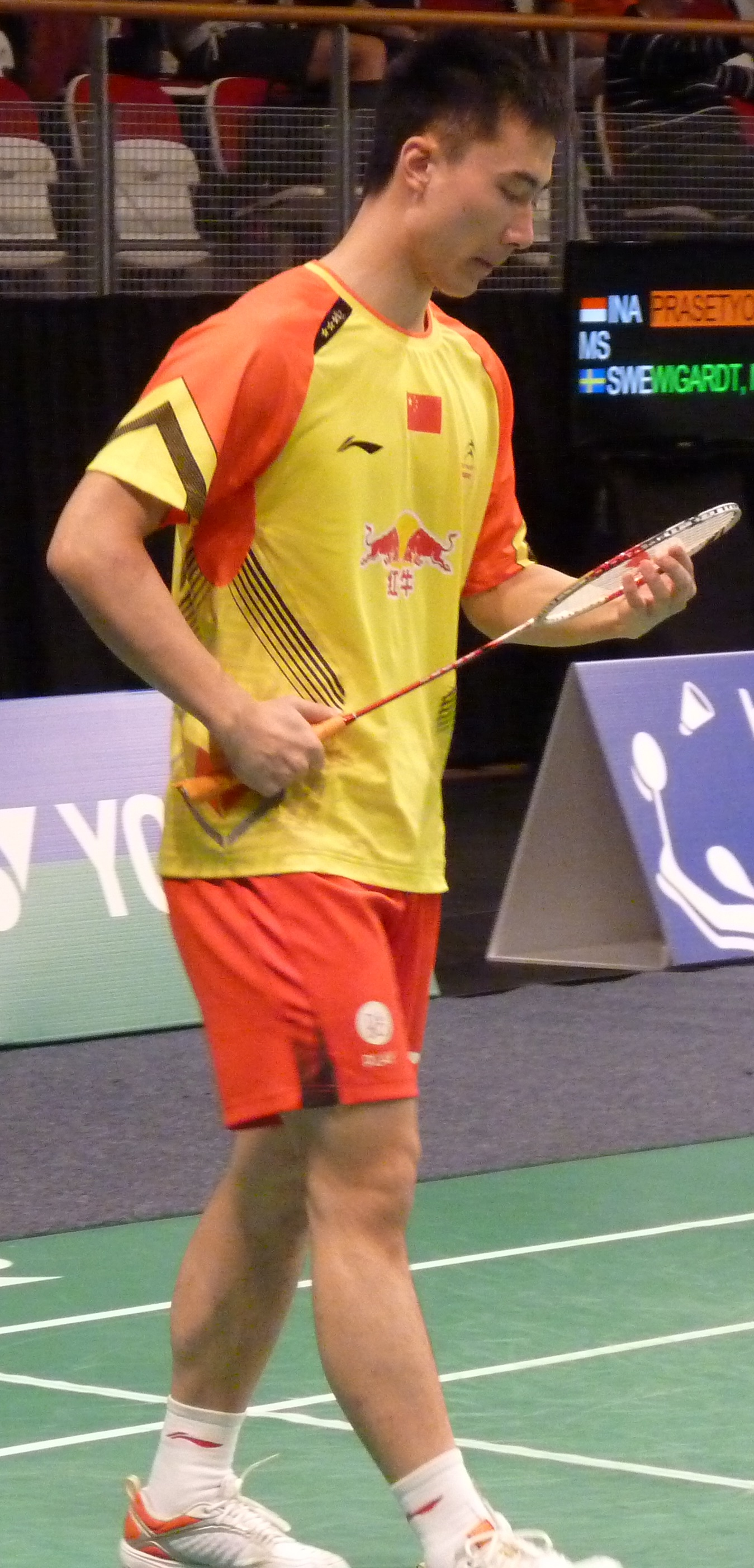

Personal information
- Born: 25 January 1993 (age 33) Hangzhou, Zhejiang, China
- Height: 1.80 m (5 ft 11 in)

Sport
- Country: China
- Sport: Badminton
- Handedness: Right

Men's singles
- Highest ranking: 20 (19 January 2017)
- Current ranking: 284 (18 October 2022)
- BWF profile
Medal record
Men's badminton
Representing China
World Junior Championships
Gold medal – first place	2010 Guadalajara	Mixed team
Asian Junior Championships
Gold medal – first place	2010 Kuala Lumpur	Boys' singles
Gold medal – first place	2010 Kuala Lumpur	Mixed team
Gold medal – first place	2011 Lucknow	Mixed team

Huang Yuxiang (Chinese: 黄宇翔; born 25 January 1993) is a Chinese badminton player. He won his first international senior title at the 2016 New Zealand Open.

== Achievements ==
=== Asian Junior Championships ===
Boys' singles

Year	Venue	Opponent	Score	Result
2010	Stadium Juara, Kuala Lumpur, Malaysia	(Malaysia) Loh Wei Sheng	14–21, 21–17, 21–16	Gold

=== BWF Grand Prix (1 title, 3 runners-up) ===
The BWF Grand Prix had two levels, the Grand Prix and Grand Prix Gold. It was a series of badminton tournaments sanctioned by the Badminton World Federation (BWF) and played between 2007 and 2017.

Men's singles

Year	Tournament	Opponent	Score	Result
2015	China Masters	(China) Wang Zhengming	20–22, 19–21	(silver) Runner-up
2016	Syed Modi International	(India) Srikanth Kidambi	13–21, 21–14, 14–21	(silver) Runner-up
2016	New Zealand Open	(Japan) Riichi Takeshita	21–12, 21–17	(gold) Winner
2016	Indonesian Masters	(China) Shi Yuqi	12–21, 0–11 Retired	(silver) Runner-up

BWF Grand Prix Gold tournament
BWF Grand Prix tournament
