= Kasper Lehikoinen =

Finnish badminton player (born 1992)

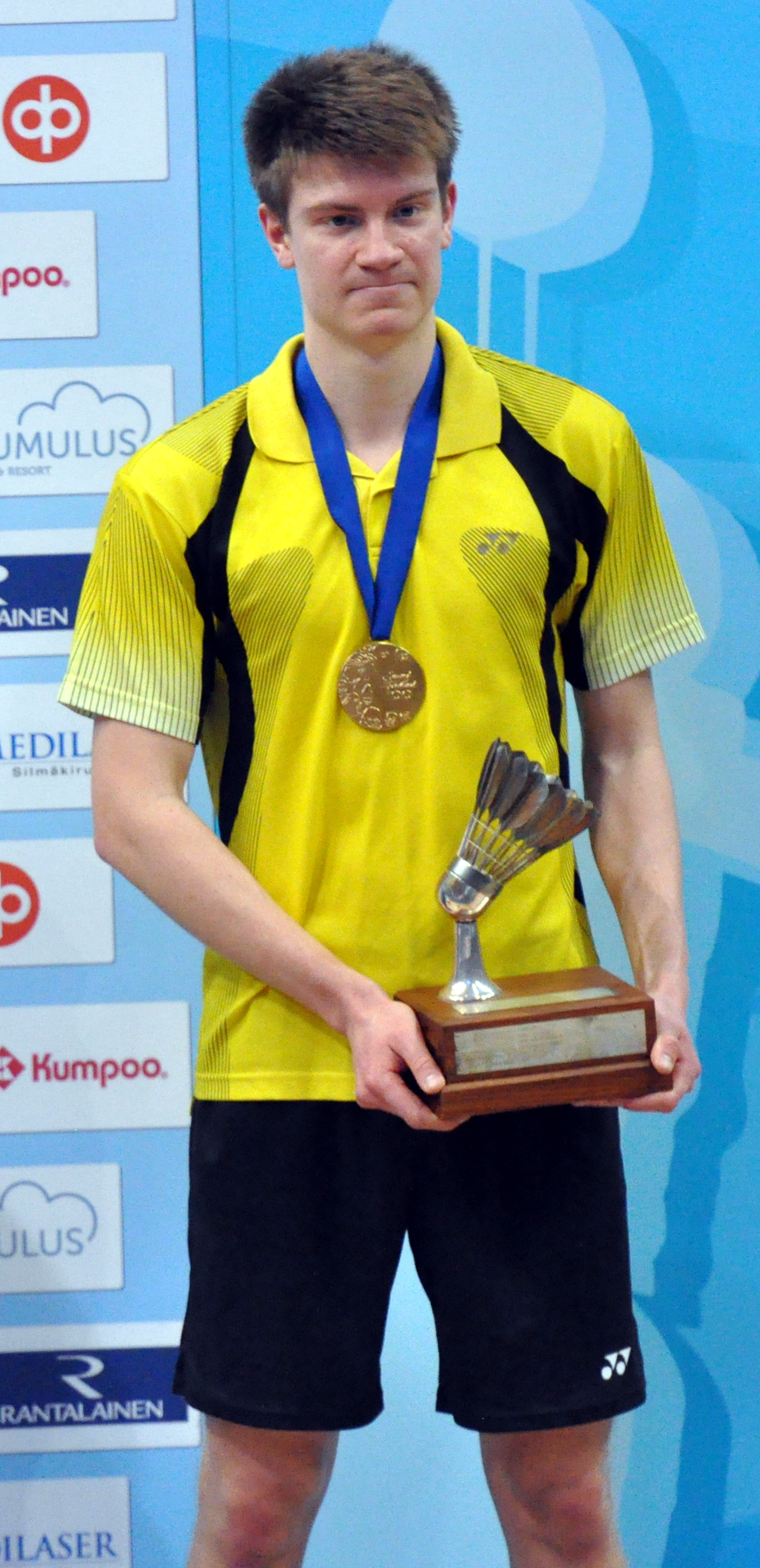

Personal information
- Born: 20 April 1992 (age 34)
- Height: 1.87 m (6 ft 2 in)

Sport
- Country: Finland
- Sport: Badminton
- Coached by: Jari Lehikoinen

Men's singles
- Highest ranking: 116 (16 October 2014)
- Current ranking: 581 (5 April 2022)
- BWF profile
Medal record
Men's badminton
Representing Finland
European Junior Championships
Bronze medal – third place	2009 Milan	Boys' singles
Bronze medal – third place	2011 Vantaa	Boys' singles

Kasper Lehikoinen (born 20 April 1992) is a Finnish badminton player. Trained at the BC Blue, he won bronze medals at the European Junior Badminton Championships in 2009 and 2011.

== Achievements ==
=== European Junior Championships ===
Boys' singles
Year	Venue	Opponent	Score	Result
2009	Federal Technical Centre - Palabadminton, Milan, Italy	(Denmark) Emil Holst	10–21, 15–21	Bronze
2011	Energia Arena, Vantaa, Finland	(Denmark) Rasmus Fladberg	13–21, 12–21	Bronze

=== BWF International Challenge/Series (5 titles, 4 runners-up) ===
Men's singles
Year	Tournament	Opponent	Score	Result
2013	Norwegian International	(Netherlands) Mark Caljouw	21–17, 21–16	(gold) Winner
2014	Lithuanian International	(Poland) Mateusz Dubowski	18–21, 21–9, 21–13	(gold) Winner
2014	Finnish International	(Finland) Eetu Heino	14–21, 17–21	(silver) Runner-up
2016	Latvia International	(France) Toma Junior Popov	14–21, 14–21	(silver) Runner-up
2016	Lithuanian International	(Russia) Sergey Sirant	21–12, 21–18	(gold) Winner
2017	Croatian International	(Croatia) Zvonimir Đurkinjak	21–14, 21–16	(gold) Winner
2017	Latvia International	(Germany) Kai Schäfer	11–21, 14–21	(silver) Runner up
2019	Iceland International	(Denmark) Mikkel Enghøj	19–21, 17–21	(silver) Runner up

Men's doubles
Year	Tournament	Partner	Opponent	Score	Result
2014	Riga International	(Finland) Marko Pyykönen	(Poland) Mateusz Dubowski (Poland) Jacek Kołumbajew	21–12, 21–18	(gold) Winner

BWF International Challenge tournament
BWF International Series tournament
BWF Future Series tournament
