= Flemming Quach =

Danish badminton player (born 1992)

Personal information
- Born: 11 April 1992 (age 34) Aarhus, Denmark
- Height: 1.75 m (5 ft 9 in)

Sport
- Country: Denmark
- Sport: Badminton
- Handedness: Right

Men's singles
- Highest ranking: 69 (16 January 2014)
- BWF profile
Medal record
Men's badminton
Representing Denmark
European Men's Team Championships
| Gold medal – first place | 2014 Basel | Men's team |
European Junior Championships
| Bronze medal – third place | 2011 Vantaa | Mixed team |

Flemming Quach (born 11 April 1992) is a Danish badminton player. He was born in Aarhus, Denmark to Vietnamese parents.

== Achievements ==
=== BWF International Challenge/Series ===
Men's singles

| Year | Tournament | Opponent | Score | Result |
|---|---|---|---|---|
| 2013 | French International | (England) Rajiv Ouseph | 15–21, 15–21 | (silver) Runner-up |
| 2013 | Welsh International | (Spain) Pablo Abián | 12–21, 13–21 | (silver) Runner-up |
| 2014 | Slovenian International | (Denmark) Christian Lind Thomsen | 21–6, 21–13 | (gold) Winner |

BWF International Challenge tournament
BWF International Series tournament
BWF Future Series tournament
