= Emre Lale =

Turkish badminton player (born 1993)

Personal information
- Born: 14 October 1993 (age 33) Bursa, Turkey
- Height: 1.84 m (6 ft 0 in)
- Weight: 72 kg (159 lb)

Sport
- Country: Turkey
- Sport: Badminton

Men's singles & doubles
- Highest ranking: 89 (MS 9 August 2018); 136 (MD 20 October 2011); 294 (XD 1 December 2011)
- Current ranking: 138 (MS 28 June 2022)
- BWF profile
Medal record
Men's badminton
Representing Turkey
Mediterranean Games
Bronze medal – third place	2022 Oran	Men's singles
European Junior Championships
Bronze medal – third place	2011 Vantaa	Boys' singles

Emre Lale (born 14 October 1993) is a Turkish badminton player. Lale was born in Bursa, and trained at the A.B.B. EGO SPOR Kulübü As a junior player, he represented his country competed at the 2010 Summer Youth Olympics in Singapore. In 2011, he won a bronze medal at the European Junior Championships in the boys' singles event. Lale won his first senior international title at the Iraq International in the men's singles event. He competed at the 2013 and 2018 Mediterranean Games, also at the 2019 European Games.

== Achievements ==
=== Mediterranean Games ===
Men's singles
Year	Venue	Opponent	Score	Result	Ref.
2022	Multipurpose Omnisports Hall; Oued Tlélat, Algeria	(Spain) Pablo Abián	16–21, 18–21	Bronze	

=== European Junior Championships ===
Boys' singles
Year	Venue	Opponent	Score	Result
2011	Energia Areena; Vantaa, Finland	(Denmark) Viktor Axelsen	10–21, 3–21	Bronze

=== BWF International Challenge/Series (1 title, 3 runners-up) ===
Men's singles
Year	Tournament	Opponent	Score	Result
2012	Iraq International	(India) Subhankar Dey	21–17, 22–20	(gold) Winner
2017	Pakistan International	(Vietnam) Lê Đức Phát	21–15, 11–21, 11–21	(silver) Runner-up
2018	Turkey International	(Indonesia) Ikhsan Rumbay	9–21, 14–21	(silver) Runner-up
2025	Czech International	(Austria) Collins Valentine Filimon	10–15, 7–15	(silver) Runner-up

BWF International Challenge tournament
BWF International Series tournament
BWF Future Series tournament
