= Lucas Claerbout =

French badminton player (born 1992)

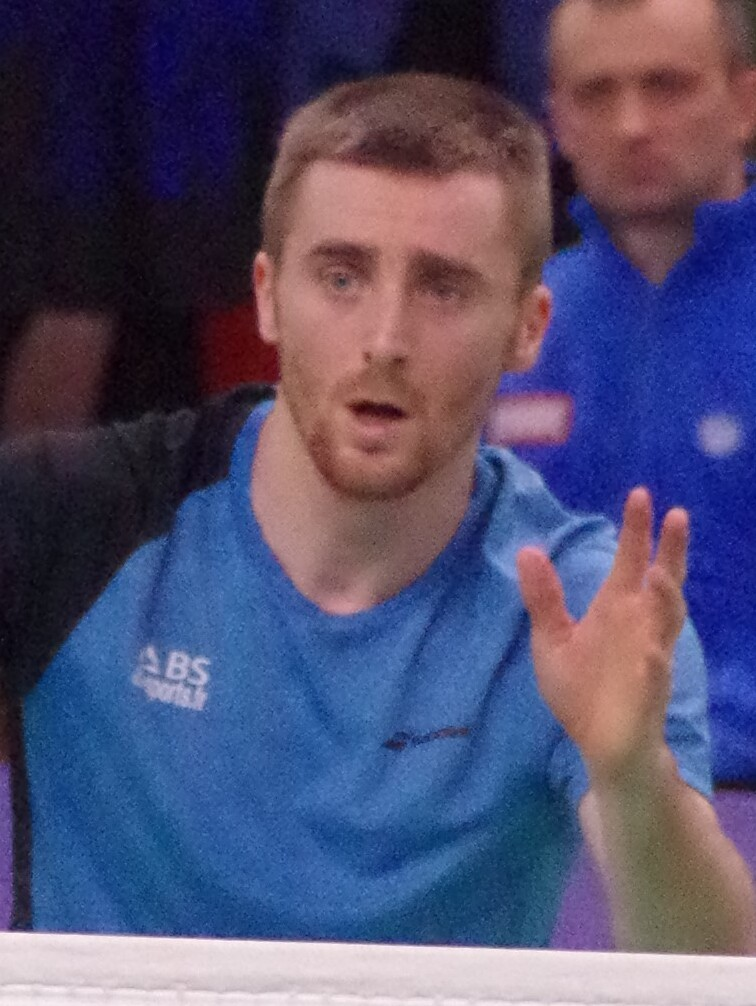
- Claerbout at the 2020 Estonian International

Personal information
- Born: Lucas Florent Claerbout; 22 October 1992 (age 34) Bordeaux, France
- Years active: 2011–present
- Height: 1.75 m (5 ft 9 in)

Sport
- Country: France
- Sport: Badminton
- Handedness: Right

Men's singles
- Highest ranking: 52 (3 January 2023)
- Current ranking: 90 (19 September 2023)
- BWF profile
Medal record
Men's badminton
Representing France
European Men's Team Championships
Silver medal – second place	2016 Kazan	Men's team
Silver medal – second place	2024 Łódź	Men's team
Bronze medal – third place	2018 Kazan	Men's team
Bronze medal – third place	2020 Liévin	Men's team

Lucas Florent Claerbout (born 22 October 1992) is a French badminton player. He started playing badminton at Union Sportive Talence club in 2010, then in 2014, he joined the national team. Claerbout won the men's singles title in 2018 French National Championships. He along national team won the silver medal at the 2016 European Men's Team Championships in Kazan, Russia.

== Achievements ==
=== BWF World Tour ===
The BWF World Tour, which was announced on 19 March 2017 and implemented in 2018, is a series of elite badminton tournaments sanctioned by the Badminton World Federation (BWF). The BWF World Tour is divided into levels of World Tour Finals, Super 1000, Super 750, Super 500, Super 300, and the BWF Tour Super 100.

Men's singles
Year	Tournament	Level	Opponent	Score	Result
2022	Syed Modi International	Super 300	(France) Arnaud Merklé	Withdrew	(silver) Runner-up

=== BWF International Challenge/Series (5 titles, 5 runners-up) ===
Men's singles
Year	Tournament	Opponent	Score	Result
2015	Eurasia Bulgaria International	(Estonia) Raul Must	15–21, 20–22	(silver) Runner-up
2015	Irish Open	(Denmark) Anders Antonsen	18–21, 20–22	(silver) Runner-up
2016	Estonian International	(Finland) Ville Lång	17–21, 19–21	(silver) Runner-up
2016	White Nights	(France) Lucas Corvée	21–15, 21–11	(gold) Winner
2017	Morocco International	(Denmark) Soren Toft Hansen	21–14, 21–13	(gold) Winner
2017	Turkey International	(Turkey) Muhammed Ali Kurt	21–16, 21–10	(gold) Winner
2018	Estonian International	(Sweden) Jacob Nilsson	21–16, 21–6	(gold) Winner
2020	Estonian International	(Japan) Hashiru Shimono	13–21, 17–21	(silver) Runner-up
2023	Belgian International	(Finland) Joakim Oldorff	22–20, 21–17	(gold) Winner

Men's doubles
Year	Tournament	Partner	Opponent	Score	Result
2015	Peru International	(France) Lucas Corvée	(Poland) Adam Cwalina (Poland) Przemysław Wacha	18–21, 11–21	(silver) Runner-up

BWF International Challenge tournament
BWF International Series tournament
BWF Future Series tournament
