= Iran at the Youth Olympics =

- IOC code: IRI
- NOC: National Olympic Committee of the Islamic Republic of Iran
- Website: Official website
- Medals Ranked TBDth: Gold 13 Silver 9 Bronze 11 Total 33

Summer appearances
- 2010; 2014; 2018; 2026

Winter appearances
- 2012; 2016; 2020; 2024

Iran has participated at the Summer and Winter Youth Olympic Games in every edition since the inaugural 2010 Summer Games and 2012 Winter Games.

== Medal tables ==
=== Medals by Summer Games ===
Games	Athletes	Gold	Silver	Bronze	Total	Rank
2010 Singapore	52	2	2	1	5	26
(China) 2014 Nanjing	16	3	0	3	6	24
(Argentina) 2018 Buenos Aires	49	7	3	4	14	7
(Senegal) 2026 Dakar	29	1	4	3	8	TBD
Total (4/4)	146	13	9	11	33	TBD

=== Medals by Winter Games ===
Games	Athletes	Gold	Silver	Bronze	Total	Rank
(Austria) 2012 Innsbruck	3	0	0	0	0	-
(Norway) 2016 Lillehammer	2	0	0	0	0	-
(Switzerland) 2020 Lausanne	6	0	0	0	0	-
(South Korea) 2024 Gangwon	5	0	0	0	0	-
Total (4/4)	16	0	0	0	0	-

== Medals by sports ==
=== Summer Games ===
Games	Gold	Silver	Bronze	Total
Football	0	0	1	1
Gymnastics	0	0	1	1
Judo	1	1	0	2
Karate	1	0	3	4
Swimming	0	1	0	1
Taekwondo	7	3	1	11
Weightlifting	2	0	0	2
Wushu	0	0	1	1
Wrestling	2	4	4	10
Total (9)	13	9	11	33

=== Winter Games ===
No medals won.

== Medalists ==
=== Summer Games ===
==== 2010 ====
Medal	Name	Sport	Event
Gold	Kaveh Rezaei	Taekwondo	Boys' 55 kg
Gold	Alireza Kazeminejad	Weightlifting	Boys' +85 kg
Silver	Mohammad Soleimani	Taekwondo	Boys' 48 kg
Silver	Mehran Sheikhi	Wrestling	Boys' freestyle 46 kg
Bronze	Yousef Ghaderian	Wrestling	Boys' Greco-Roman 69 kg

==== 2014 ====
Medal	Name	Sport	Event
Gold	Ramin Safavieh	Judo	Boys' 100 kg
Gold	Mehdi Eshaghi	Taekwondo	Boys' 48 kg
Gold	Kimia Alizadeh	Taekwondo	Girls' 63 kg
Bronze	Danial Salehimehr	Taekwondo	Boys' 73 kg
Bronze	Mohammad Reza Aghania	Wrestling	Boys' Greco-Roman 50 kg
Bronze	Keramat Abdevali	Wrestling	Boys' Greco-Roman 58 kg

==== 2018 ====
Medal	Name	Sport	Event
Gold	Navid Mohammadi	Karate	Boys' +68 kg
Gold	Yalda Valinejad	Taekwondo	Girls' 63 kg
Gold	Ali Eshkevarian	Taekwondo	Boys' 73 kg
Gold	Mohammad Ali Khosravi	Taekwondo	Boys' +73 kg
Gold	Alireza Yousefi	Weightlifting	Boys' +85 kg
Gold	Amir Reza Dehbozorgi	Wrestling	Boys' Greco-Roman 45 kg
Gold	Mohammad Nosrati	Wrestling	Boys' Greco-Roman 92 kg
Silver	Kimia Hemmati	Taekwondo	Girls' +63 kg
Silver	Mohammad Karimi	Wrestling	Boys' freestyle 65 kg
Silver	Amir Hossein Zare	Wrestling	Boys' freestyle 110 kg
Bronze	Reza Bohloulzadeh	Gymnastics	Boys' pommel horse
Bronze	Fatemeh Khonakdar	Karate	Girls' 53 kg
Bronze	Mobina Heidari	Karate	Girls' 59 kg
Bronze	Negin Altooni	Karate	Girls' +59 kg

=== Winter Games ===
No medals won.

== Flag bearers ==
#	Games	Season	Flag bearer	Sport
1	2010 Singapore	Summer	Amir Sedighi	Basketball
2	2012 Innsbruck	Winter	Yaghoub Kiashemshaki	Cross-country skiing
3	2014 Nanjing	Summer	Kimia Alizadeh	Taekwondo
4	2016 Lillehammer	Winter	Ava Javadi	Alpine skiing
5	2018 Buenos Aires	Summer	Mohammad Nosrati	Wrestling
6	2020 Lausanne	Winter	Roksana Saveh Shemshaki	Ski mountaineering
7	2024 Gangwon	Winter		
8	2026 Dakar	Summer		

== See also ==
- Iran at the Olympics
- Iran at the Paralympics
