= Weightlifting at the 2010 Summer Youth Olympics =

Weightlifting at the I Summer Youth Olympic Games
- Venue: Toa Payoh Sports Hall
- Dates: 15 – 19 August 2010
- No. of events: 11 (6 boys, 5 girls)

The weightlifting competition at the 2010 Summer Youth Olympics took place in Singapore in the Toa Payoh Sports Hall from 15–19 August.

== Event Summary ==
=== Medal table ===
Rank	Nation	Gold	Silver	Bronze	Total
1	China	2	2	0	4
1	Russia	2	2	0	4
3	Bulgaria	2	0	0	2
4	Kazakhstan	1	1	1	3
5	North Korea	1	0	1	2
6	Azerbaijan	1	0	0	1
6	Iran	1	0	0	1
6	Vietnam	1	0	0	1
9	Thailand	0	3	0	3
10	Armenia	0	1	1	2
11	Chinese Taipei	0	1	0	1
11	Colombia	0	1	0	1
13	Cuba	0	0	1	1
13	Egypt	0	0	1	1
13	Indonesia	0	0	1	1
13	Mexico	0	0	1	1
13	Nigeria	0	0	1	1
13	Turkey	0	0	1	1
13	Ukraine	0	0	1	1
13	Venezuela	0	0	1	1
Totals (20 entries)		11	11	11	33

=== Women's events ===
Event	Gold	Silver	Bronze
48 kg	Tian Yuan; China	Sirivimon Pramongkhol; Thailand	Génesis Rodríguez; Venezuela
53 kg	Boyanka Kostova; Bulgaria	Kuo Hsing-Chun; Chinese Taipei	Dewi Safitri; Indonesia
58 kg	Deng Wei; China	Zulfiya Chinshanlo; Kazakhstan	Racheal Ekoshoria; Nigeria
63 kg	Zhazira Zhapparkul; Kazakhstan	Diana Akhmetova; Russia	Aremi Fuentes; Mexico
+63 kg	Olga Zubova; Russia	Chitchanok Pulsabsakul; Thailand	Kuk Hyang Kim; North Korea

=== Men's events ===
Event	Gold	Silver	Bronze
56 kg	Thạch Kim Tuấn; Vietnam	Xie Jiawu; China	Smbat Margaryan; Armenia
62 kg	Kim Song-chol; North Korea	José Mena; Colombia	Emre Büyükünlü; Turkey
69 kg	Nijat Rahimov; Azerbaijan	Gong Xingbin; China	Ediel Márquez; Cuba
77 kg	Artem Okulov; Russia	Chatuphum Chinnawong; Thailand	Rustem Sybay; Kazakhstan
85 kg	Georgi Shikov; Bulgaria	Alexey Kosov; Russia	Kostyantyn Reva; Ukraine
+85 kg	Alireza Kazeminejad; Iran	Gor Minasyan; Armenia	Hassan Mohamed; Egypt

== Events Schedule ==
All events are scheduled to be 2 hours long.
Events include the main competition (approx. 1:50 hours) and the awards ceremony (approx. 0:10 hours).

	Event	Date of Week	Event Day	Starting Time
Women's	48kg	Sunday	15 August	14:30
Women's	53kg	Monday	16 August	14:30
Women's	58kg	Tuesday	17 August	11:00
Women's	63kg	Tuesday	17 August	18:00
Women's	+63kg	Wednesday	18 August	14:30
Men's	56kg	Sunday	15 August	18:00
Men's	62kg	Monday	16 August	18:00
Men's	69kg	Tuesday	17 August	14:30
Men's	77kg	Wednesday	18 August	11:00
Men's	85kg	Wednesday	18 August	18:00
Men's	+85kg	Thursday	19 August	11:00

== Qualified Athletes ==
=== Women's ===
Event	Name	Country
48kg	Lilla Berki	Hungary
48kg	Atenery Hernandez	Spain
48kg	Kay Khine Khine	Myanmar
48kg	Matsa Matsa	India
48kg	Thi Hong Nguyen	Vietnam
48kg	Sirivimon Pramongkhol	Thailand
48kg	Génesis Rodríguez	Venezuela
48kg	Yuan Tian	China
53kg	Damla Aydin	Turkey
53kg	Diana Cadena	Colombia
53kg	Alena Chychkan	Belarus
53kg	Boyanka Kostova	Bulgaria
53kg	Hsing-Chun Kuo	Chinese Taipei
53kg	Oumaima Majri	Tunisia
53kg	Yineisy Reyes	Dominican Republic
53kg	Dewi Safitri	Indonesia
53kg	Ranuinu Samuel	Papua New Guinea
53kg	Lomina Tibon	Marshall Islands
58kg	Zulfiya Chinshanlo	Kazakhstan
58kg	Wei Deng	China
58kg	Racheal Ekoshoria	Nigeria
58kg	Wafo Ghekap	Cameroon
58kg	Veronica Haro	Ecuador
58kg	Louise Lolohea	Fiji
58kg	Amal Mohamed	Egypt
58kg	Fatin Atikah Osman	Malaysia
58kg	Silvana Saldarriaga	Peru
58kg	Jamie Emma Wee	Singapore
63kg	Diana Akhmetova	Russia
63kg	Jessica Beed	United States
63kg	Aremi Fuentes	Mexico
63kg	Michelle Kahi	Australia
63kg	Patricia Llena	Philippines
63kg	Neslihan Okumus	Turkey
63kg	Zhazira Zhapparkul	Kazakhstan
+63kg	Andreea Aanei	Romania
+63kg	Carlotta Brunelli	Italy
+63kg	Hapilyn Iro	Solomon Islands
+63kg	Kuk Hyang Kim	North Korea
+63kg	Milena Kruczynska	Poland
+63kg	Stefania Muñoz	Colombia
+63kg	Yoon Hee Park	South Korea
+63kg	Chitchanok Pulsabsakul	Thailand
+63kg	Ganna Pustovarova	Uzbekistan
+63kg	Prabdeep Sanghera	Canada
+63kg	Miku Shichinohe	Japan
+63kg	Iuniarra Simanu	Samoa
+63kg	Tetyana Syrota	Ukraine
+63kg	Chi-Ling Yao	Chinese Taipei
+63kg	Olga Zubova	Russia

=== Men's ===
Event	Name	Country
56kg	Karem Ben Hnia	Tunisia
56kg	Elson Brechtefeld	Nauru
56kg	Florin Croitoru	Romania
56kg	Smbat Margaryan	Armenia
56kg	Ihtiyor Matkerimov	Turkmenistan
56kg	Juan Prado	Venezuela
56kg	Phello John Ramela	South Africa
56kg	Amon Shiro	Marshall Islands
56kg	Kim Tuan Thach	Vietnam
56kg	Jiawu Xie	China
56kg	Artjoms Zerebkovs	Latvia
62kg	Mohsen Al Duhaylib	Saudi Arabia
62kg	Emre Büyükünlü	Turkey
62kg	Song Chol Kim	North Korea
62kg	Joel Wei Law	Singapore
62kg	José Mena	Colombia
62kg	Thien Quoc Nguyen	Vietnam
62kg	Baymurad Orazdurdiyev	Turkmenistan
62kg	Rene Pizango	Ecuador
62kg	Patryk Slowikowski	Poland
62kg	Charles Ssekyaya	Uganda
62kg	Michael Taufa	Tonga
62kg	Zainudin Zainudin	Indonesia
69kg	Tairat Bunsuk	Thailand
69kg	Housseyn Fardjallah	Algeria
69kg	Mohsen Glazalian	Iran
69kg	Xingbin Gong	China
69kg	Steven Kari	Papua New Guinea
69kg	Ziyobitddin Kutbitddinov	Uzbekistan
69kg	Charlie Lolohea	Fiji
69kg	Ediel Marquez Ona	Cuba
69kg	Joshua Milne	New Zealand
69kg	Nico Muller	Germany
69kg	Nijat Rahimov	Azerbaijan
69kg	Maraj Tubal	Libya
77kg	Kabuati Silas Bob	Kiribati
77kg	Chatuphum Chinnawong	Thailand
77kg	Maverick Faustino	Palau
77kg	Yi-Yuan Huang	Chinese Taipei
77kg	Ossama Khattab	Egypt
77kg	Liam Larkins	Australia
77kg	Artem Okulov	Russia
77kg	Luca Parla	Italy
77kg	Rustem Sybay	Kazakhstan
85kg	Irfan Butt	Pakistan
85kg	Saumaleato Fa'agu	American Samoa
85kg	Alexey Kosov	Russia
85kg	Cristopher Pavon	Honduras
85kg	Kostyantyn Reva	Ukraine
85kg	Georgi Shikov	Bulgaria
85kg	Jose Miguel Velez	Colombia
85kg	Aliaksandr Venskel	Belarus
+85kg	Melih Akin	Turkey
+85kg	Alireza Kazeminejad	Iran
+85kg	Nelson Anthony Mansilla Felipe	Guatemala
+85kg	Gor Minasyan	Armenia
+85kg	Hassan Mohamed	Egypt
+85kg	Mahmood Khaleel Sabaawi	Iraq
+85kg	Moises Sotelo	Mexico
