= Iran at the 2010 Summer Youth Olympics =

- IOC code: IRI
- NOC: National Olympic Committee of the Islamic Republic of Iran

in Singapore
- Competitors: 52 in 13 sports
- Flag bearer: Amir Sedighi
- Medals Ranked 26th: Gold 2 Silver 2 Bronze 1 Total 5

Summer Youth Olympics appearances (overview)
- 2010; 2014; 2018; 2026

Iran participated at the 2010 Summer Youth Olympics in Singapore.

== Competitors ==
Sport	Boys	Girls	Total
3x3 basketball	4		4
Aquatics, Swimming	2		2
Archery		1	1
Athletics	1		1
Boxing	1		1
Canoeing	1		1
Football		18	18
Judo	2		2
Shooting	1	1	2
Taekwondo	2	1	3
Volleyball	12		12
Weightlifting	2		2
Wrestling	3		3
Total	31	21	52

== Medal summary ==
=== Medal table ===
Sport	Gold	Silver	Bronze	Total
Taekwondo	1	1		2
Weightlifting	1			1
Wrestling		1	1	2
Total	2	2	1	5

=== Medalists ===
Medal	Name	Sport	Event
Gold	Kaveh Rezaei	Taekwondo	Boys' 55 kg
Gold	Alireza Kazeminejad	Weightlifting	Boys' +85 kg
Silver	Mohammad Soleimani	Taekwondo	Boys' 48 kg
Silver	Mehran Sheikhi	Wrestling	Boys' freestyle 46 kg
Bronze	Yousef Ghaderian	Wrestling	Boys' Greco-Roman 69 kg

== Results by event ==
=== 3x3 basketball ===
Athlete	Event	Preliminary round					Quarterfinal	Semifinal	Final	Rank
Athlete	Event	Round 1	Round 2	Round 3	Round 4	Rank	Quarterfinal	Semifinal	Final	Rank
Mohammad Ojaghi; Sajjad Mashayekhi; Amir Sedighi; Arman Zangeneh	Boys	Egypt; W 27–21	Lithuania; L 18–29	Argentina; L 21–24	Panama; W 29–21	4	9th–16th places New Zealand; W 29–17	9th–12th places Philippines; L 19–28	11th place match Turkey; W 31–25	11

=== Aquatics ===
==== Swimming ====
Athlete	Event	Heats		Semifinals		Final	
Athlete	Event	Time	Rank	Time	Rank	Time	Rank
Ahmad Reza Jalali	Boys' 50 m freestyle	24.43	23	Did not advance			
Homayoun Haghighi	Boys' 100 m butterfly	58.34	27	Did not advance			
Ahmad Reza Jalali	Boys' 100 m butterfly	57.84	26	Did not advance			
Homayoun Haghighi	Boys' 200 m butterfly	2:09.45	19	—N/a		Did not advance	
Ahmad Reza Jalali	Boys' 200 m individual medley	2:12.43	23	—N/a		Did not advance	

=== Archery ===
Girls' recurve

Athlete	Event	Ranking round		1/16 eliminations	1/8 eliminations	Quarterfinal	Semifinal	Final	Rank
Athlete	Event	Score	Seed	1/16 eliminations	1/8 eliminations	Quarterfinal	Semifinal	Final	Rank
Yasaman Shirian	Individual	565	22	Viehmeier (GER); L 2–6; 23–25, 20–25, 27–26, 21–27	Did not advance				17

Mixed recurve

Athlete	Event	Ranking round		1/16 eliminations	1/8 eliminations	Quarterfinal	Semifinal	Final	Rank
Athlete	Event	Score	Seed	1/16 eliminations	1/8 eliminations	Quarterfinal	Semifinal	Final	Rank
Sabry (EGY); Shirian (IRI)	Team	1196	18	Ipsen (DEN); Mîrca (MDA); L 5–6; 35–29, 33–36, 37–32, 31–34, 36–36, 16–18	Did not advance				17

=== Athletics ===
Boys

Athlete	Event	Qualification		Final		Rank
Athlete	Event	Result	Rank	Result	Rank	Rank
Mohammad Reza Vazifehdoust	High jump	2.00	12 QB	2.07	3	11

=== Boxing ===
Athlete	Event	Quarterfinal	Semifinal	Final	Rank
Bijan Khojasteh	Boys' 81 kg	Begaliev (UZB); L 2–4	Did not advance	5th place match Elpiev (RUS); L RSC	6

=== Canoeing ===
Athlete	Event	Heats		Round of 32	Repechage	Round of 16	Quarterfinal	Semifinal	Final	Rank
Athlete	Event	Time	Rank	Round of 32	Repechage	Round of 16	Quarterfinal	Semifinal	Final	Rank
Ali Aghamirzaei	Boys' slalom K1	1:41.01	11 Q	Mora (CUB); W 1:39.13–1:41.67	Bye	Ooi (SIN); L 1:43.21–1:35.80	Did not advance			11
Ali Aghamirzaei	Boys' sprint K1	1:32.78	3 Q	Urban (SVK); W 1:33.26–1:56.99	Bye	Tsarykovich (BLR); L 1:31.94–1:31.20	Did not advance			9

=== Football ===
Team	Event	Preliminary round			Semifinal	Final	Rank
Team	Event	Round 1	Round 2	Rank	Semifinal	Final	Rank
Iran	Girls	Turkey; L 2–4	Papua New Guinea; W 1–0	2 Q	Equatorial Guinea; L 1–4	3rd place match Turkey; L 0–3	4
Roster: Mahdieh Amighi; Fatemeh Khalaji; Kosar Kamali; Nastaran Moradloo; Sarshin Kamangar; Yasaman Pakjoo; Mogharrab Zadhosseinali; Shahin Aflaki; Fatemeh Adeli; Fatemeh Ardestani; Behnaz Taherkhani; Maryam Nami; Fatemeh Shirafkannejad; Soghra Farmani; Zahra Kouravand; Aynaz Fallah; Azita Malmoli; Hanieh Mirzaei; Coach: Shahrzad Mozaffar

=== Judo ===
Athlete	Event	Round of 32	Round of 16	Quarterfinal	Semifinal	Repechage 1	Repechage 2	Final	Rank
Farshid Ghasemi	Boys' 66 kg	Bye	Schneider (USA); L 000–022	Repechage; Persoglia (SMR); W 101–000	Repechage; Ferreira (AND); W 100–000	Repechage; Vitkauskas (LTU); W 012–000	Repechage; Cai (DEN); L 000–100	Did not advance	7
Shayan Nassirpour	Boys' 100 kg	—N/a	Bye	Nikiforov (BEL); L 001–020	Did not advance	—N/a	Repechage; Toktogonov (KGZ); L 000–001	Did not advance	7
Farshid Ghasemi (as part of Team Paris)	Mixed team	—N/a	Team Tokyo; L 3–5	Did not advance		—N/a		Did not advance	9

=== Shooting ===
Athlete	Event	Qualification		Final		
Athlete	Event	Score	Rank	Score	Total	Rank
Sepehr Saffari	Boys' 10 m air pistol	561	12	Did not advance		
Yasaman Heidari	Girls' 10 m air pistol	367	16	Did not advance		

=== Taekwondo ===
Athlete	Event	Round of 16	Quarterfinal	Semifinal	Final	Rank
Mohammad Soleimani	Boys' 48 kg	—N/a	Rasulov (UZB); W 5–1	English (USA); W 3–1	Haimovitz (ISR); L WO	2nd place, silver medalist(s)
Kaveh Rezaei	Boys' 55 kg	Bye	Sertune (HAI); W RSC (6–0)	Tan (SIN); W RSC (12–0)	Mamayev (KAZ); W 4–2	1st place, gold medalist(s)
Maryam Shirjahani	Girls' 44 kg	Tuncer (TUR); L 0–11	Did not advance			9

=== Volleyball ===
Team	Event	Preliminary round			Semifinal	Final	Rank
Team	Event	Round 1	Round 2	Rank	Semifinal	Final	Rank
Iran	Boys	Argentina; L 0–3 (12–25, 9–25, 27–29)	Cuba; L 1–3 (25–21, 22–25, 19–25, 22–25)	3	Did not advance	5th place match DR Congo; W 3–0 (25–9, 25–15, 25–17)	5
Roster: Alireza Nasr Esfahani; Ata Zeraatgar; Shahab Ahmadi; Ramin Khani; Faramarz Zarif; Ali Nodouzpour; Kamal Ghoreishi; Ali Daneshpour; Mooud Aghapour; Javad Hosseinabadi; Meisam Faridi; Babak Amiri; Coach: Nasser Shahnazi

=== Weightlifting ===
Athlete	Event	Snatch		Clean & Jerk		Total	
Athlete	Event	Result	Rank	Result	Rank	Result	Rank
Mohsen Ghazalian	Boys' 69 kg	118	7	135	7	253	7
Alireza Kazeminejad	Boys' +85 kg	155	2	196	1	351	1st place, gold medalist(s)

=== Wrestling ===
Athlete	Event	Group round				Final	Rank
Athlete	Event	Round 1	Round 2	Round 3	Rank	Final	Rank
Mehran Sheikhi	Boys' freestyle 46 kg	Dávila (VEN); W 2–0 (3–1, 1–0)	Ríos (PER); W Fall (7–2)	—N/a	1 Q	Balzhinimaev (RUS); L Fall (2–4, 0–7)	2nd place, silver medalist(s)
Mehrdad Khamseh	Boys' Greco-Roman 42 kg	Baimaganbetov (KAZ); L 0–2 (0–5, 4–7)	Hussein (EGY); W Fall (4–1)	Peña (CUB); L 0–2 (0–1, 0–1)	3	5th place match Pilay (ECU); W 2–1 (1–0, 0–1, 1–0)	5
Yousef Ghaderian	Boys' Greco-Roman 69 kg	Ouakali (ALG); W 2–1 (2–0, 0–5, 2–0)	Gedik (TUR); L Fall (3–0, 0–3)	Darwish (SYR); W 2–0 (2–0, 6–0)	2 QB	3rd place match Nedashkouski (BLR); W 2–1 (2–4, 4–0, 4–0)	3rd place, bronze medalist(s)
