= Armenia at the 2010 Summer Youth Olympics =

- IOC code: ARM
- NOC: Armenian Olympic Committee
- Website: www.armnoc.am

in Singapore
- Competitors: 14 in 10 sports
- Flag bearer: Vasil Shahnazaryan
- Medals Ranked 67th: Gold 0 Silver 1 Bronze 3 Total 4

Summer Youth Olympics appearances (overview)
- 2010; 2014; 2018

Armenia participated in the 2010 Summer Youth Olympics in Singapore.

== Medalists ==
Medal	Name	Sport	Event	Date
Silver	Gor Minasyan	Weightlifting	Men's 85kg	19 Aug
Bronze	Smbat Margaryan	Weightlifting	Men's 56kg	15 Aug
Bronze	Artak Hovhannisyan	Wrestling	Men's 46kg	17 Aug
Bronze	Davit Ghazaryan	Judo	Boys' 66kg	21 Aug

== Participants ==
- Vasil Shahnazaryan
- Diana Khubeshyan
- Hrayr Matevosyan
- Edgar Babayan
- Gevorg Papoyan
- Vahan Vardanyan
- Davit Ghazaryan
- Romik Vardumyan
- Anahit Barseghyan
- Sergey Pevnev
- Smbat Margaryan
- Gor Minasyan
- Artak Hovhannisyan
- Varos Petrosyan

== Archery ==
Boys

Athlete	Event	Ranking Round		Round of 32	Round of 16	Quarterfinals	Semifinals	Final	
Athlete	Event	Score	Seed	Opposition Score	Opposition Score	Opposition Score	Opposition Score	Opposition Score	Rank
Vasil Shahnazaryan	Boys’ Individual	613	16	Rivas (ESP); L 1-7	Did not advance				17

Mixed

Athlete	Event	Partner	Round of 32	Round of 16	Quarterfinals	Semifinals	Final	
Athlete	Event	Partner	Opposition Score	Opposition Score	Opposition Score	Opposition Score	Opposition Score	Rank
Vasil Shahnazaryan	Mixed Team	Maud Custers (NED)	Leek (USA)/ Das (IND); W 6-4	Paraskevpoulou (GRE)/ Rajh (SLO); L 4-6	Did not advance			9

== Athletics ==
=== Girls ===
Track and Road Events

Athletes	Event	Qualification		Final	
Athletes	Event	Result	Rank	Result	Rank
Diana Khubeseryan	Girls’ 100m	13.03	20 qC	12.95	18

== Boxing ==
Boys

Athlete	Event	Preliminaries	Semifinals	5th Place Bout	Rank
Hrayr Matevosyan	Lightweight (60 kg)	Krishan Vikas (IND); L 2-7	Did not advance	Thomas Vahrenholt (GER); W w/o	5

== Canoeing ==
Boys

Athlete	Event	Time Trial		Round 1	Round 2 (Rep)	Round 3	Round 4	Round 5	Final
Athlete	Event	Time	Rank	Round 1	Round 2 (Rep)	Round 3	Round 4	Round 5	Final
Edgar Babayan	Boys’ C1 Slalom	1:58.88	8	Kutsev (AZE); L 2:06.43-1:54.31	Liferi (ROU); L 2:06.94-2:00.19	Soeter (GER); L 2:08.22-1:39.44	did not advance		
Edgar Babayan	Boys’ C1 Sprint	2:23.02	13	Melnyk (UKR); L 2:22.00-1:46.61	Wang (CHN); L 2:22.45-2:07.19	Queiroz (BRA); L 2:22.29-1:44.89	did not advance		

== Diving ==
Boys

Athlete	Event	Preliminary		Final	
Athlete	Event	Points	Rank	Points	Rank
Gevorg Papoyan	Boys' 3m Springboard	385.25	13	did not advance	

== Gymnastics ==
=== Artistic Gymnastics ===
Boys

Athlete	Event	Floor		Pommel Horse		Rings		Vault		Parallel Bars		Horizontal Bar		Total	
Athlete	Event	Score	Rank	Score	Rank	Score	Rank	Score	Rank	Score	Rank	Score	Rank	Score	Rank
Vahan Vardanyan	Boys' Qualification	13.600	19	13.500	11	13.900	9	14.950	22	13.150	20	13.450	14	82.550	10 Q
Vahan Vardanyan	Boys' Individual All-Around	13.700	10	13.250	9	14.000	5	14.850	12	13.100	15	13.250	13	82.150	8

== Judo ==
Individual

Athlete	Event	Round 1	Round 2	Round 3	Semifinals	Final	Rank
Athlete	Event	Opposition Result	Opposition Result	Opposition Result	Opposition Result	Opposition Result	Rank
Davit Ghazaryan	Boys' -66 kg	Persoglia (SMR); W 110-000	Cai (DEN); W 021-011	Vitkauskas (LTU); W 001-000	Schneider (USA); L 000-101	Bronze Medal Match; Tugushi (GEO); W 002-001	

Team

Team	Event	Round 1	Round 2	Semifinals	Final	Rank
Team	Event	Opposition Result	Opposition Result	Opposition Result	Opposition Result	Rank
Hamilton; Cynthia Rahming (BAH); Paolo Persoglia (SMR); Odette Giuffrida (ITA); Davit Ghazaryan (ARM); Wildjie Vertus (HAI); Jae Hyung Lee (KOR); Una Svetlana Tuba (SRB); Anis Shalabi (LBA)	Mixed Team	BYE	Cairo; L 4-4 (2-3)	did not advance		5

== Shooting ==
Pistol

Athlete	Event	Qualification		Final		
Athlete	Event	Score	Rank	Score	Total	Rank
Romik Vardumyan	Boys' 10m Air Pistol	563	10	Did not advance		

== Swimming ==
Athletes	Event	Heat		Semifinal		Final	
Athletes	Event	Time	Position	Time	Position	Time	Position
Sergey Pevnev	Boys’ 50m Freestyle	25.83	32	Did not advance			
Sergey Pevnev	Boys’ 100m Freestyle	56.97	45	Did not advance			
Anahit Barseghyan	Girls’ 50m Backstroke	32.79	17	Did not advance			

== Weightlifting ==
Athlete	Event	Snatch	Clean & Jerk	Total	Rank
Smbat Margaryan	Boys' 56kg	108	135	243	Bronze medal
Gor Minasyan	Boys' +85kg	160	190	350	Silver medal

== Wrestling ==
Freestyle

Athlete	Event	Pools		Final	Rank
Athlete	Event	Groups	Rank	Final	Rank
Artak Hovhannisyan	Boys' 46kg	Abdelnaeem (EGY); W 2–0 (6–0, 1–0)	2	3rd Place Match; Davila (VEN); W 2–0 (4–0, 5–1)	Bronze medal
Artak Hovhannisyan	Boys' 46kg	Balzhinimaev (RUS); L 0–2 (1–4, 1–4)	2	3rd Place Match; Davila (VEN); W 2–0 (4–0, 5–1)	Bronze medal

Greco-Roman

Athlete	Event	Pools		Final	Rank
Athlete	Event	Groups	Rank	Final	Rank
Varos Petrosyan	Boys' 85kg	Adzhigov (RUS); L 1–2 (0–6, 1–0, 0-1)	3	5th Place Match; Al-Abedi (IRQ); W 2–0 (7–1, 1–0)	5
Varos Petrosyan	Boys' 85kg	Choi (KOR); W Fall (3–0)	3	5th Place Match; Al-Abedi (IRQ); W 2–0 (7–1, 1–0)	5
Varos Petrosyan	Boys' 85kg	Kamilov (UZB); L 0–2 (0–3, 0–6)	3	5th Place Match; Al-Abedi (IRQ); W 2–0 (7–1, 1–0)	5
