= Syria at the 2010 Summer Youth Olympics =

- IOC code: SYR
- NOC: Syrian Olympic Committee

in Singapore
- Competitors: 4 in 4 sports
- Flag bearer: Bayan Jumah

Summer Youth Olympics appearances
- 2010; 2014; 2018

Syria competed at the 2010 Summer Youth Olympics, the inaugural Youth Olympic Games, held in Singapore from 14 August to 26 August 2010.

== Athletics ==
=== Boys ===
Track and Road Events

Athletes	Event	Qualification		Final	
Athletes	Event	Result	Rank	Result	Rank
Hazem Alhasan Alahmad	Boys’ 10km Walk			DNF	

== Equestrian ==
Athlete	Horse	Event	Round 1			Round 2			Total	Jump-Off		Rank
Athlete	Horse	Event	Penalties		Rank	Penalties		Rank	Total	Penalties	Time	Rank
Athlete	Horse	Event	Jump	Time	Rank	Jump	Time	Rank	Total	Penalties	Time	Rank
Mohamad Alanzarouti	Van Diemen	Individual Jumping	4	0	10	0	0	1	4	4	40.75	7
Mohamad Alanzarouti (SYR); Timur Patarov (KAZ); Abdurahman Al Marri (QAT); Pei Jia Caroline Chew (SIN); Sheikh Ali Abdulla Majid Alqassimi (UAE)	Van Diemen; Chatham Park Rosie; Emmaville Persuasion; Gatineau; Pearl Monarch	Team Jumping	~~8~~; ~~EL~~; 4; 4; 4	~~0~~; ~~EL~~; 0; 0; 0	4	~~4~~; 0; ~~8~~; 0; 0	~~0~~; 0; ~~0~~; 0; 0	1	12			4

== Swimming ==
Athletes	Event	Heat		Semifinal		Final	
Athletes	Event	Time	Position	Time	Position	Time	Position
Bayan Jumah	Girls’ 50m Freestyle	28.18	31	Did not advance			
Bayan Jumah	Girls’ 100m Freestyle	1:00.07	35	Did not advance			

== Wrestling ==
Greco-Roman

Athlete	Event	Pools		Final	Rank
Athlete	Event	Groups	Rank	Final	Rank
Ahmad Darwish	Boys' 69kg	Ghaderian (IRI); L 0–2 (0–2, 0–6)	4	7th Place Match; Gonzalez (NCA); W 2–0 (5–1, 3–0)	7
Ahmad Darwish	Boys' 69kg	Gedik (TUR); L 1–2 (0–7, 1–0, 0-2)	4	7th Place Match; Gonzalez (NCA); W 2–0 (5–1, 3–0)	7
Ahmad Darwish	Boys' 69kg	Ouakali (ALG); L Fall (0–5)	4	7th Place Match; Gonzalez (NCA); W 2–0 (5–1, 3–0)	7
