= Kim Song-chol =

Kim Song-chol may refer to:

- Kim Song-chol (weightlifter)
- Kim Song-chol (politician)
