= Wrestling at the 2010 Summer Youth Olympics – Boys' Greco-Roman 85 kg =

The boys' 85 kg Greco-Roman tournament in wrestling at the 2010 Summer Youth Olympics was held on August 15 at the International Convention Centre.

The event limited competitors to a maximum of 85 kilograms of body mass. The tournament had two groups where wrestlers compete in a round-robin format. The winners of each group would go on to play for the gold medal, second placers played for the bronze medal while everyone else played for classification depending on where they ranked in the group stage.

== Medalists ==
| Gold | Silver | Bronze |
|---|---|---|
| Ruslan Adzhigov; Russia | Hamdy Abdelwahab; Egypt | Ruslan Kamilov; Uzbekistan |

== Group stages ==
=== Group A ===
| Athlete | Pld | C. Points | T. Points |
|---|---|---|---|
| Hamdy Abdelwahab (EGY) | 3 | 10 | 15 |
| Lucas Sheridan (USA) | 3 | 9 | 12 |
| Adil Al-Abedi (IRQ) | 3 | 5 | 6 |
| Teia Mweia (SOL) | 3 | 0 | 0 |

| Teia Mweia (SOL) | Fall (0-5) | Lucas Sheridan (USA) |
| Adil Al-Abedi (IRQ) | 0-2 (0-1, 1-3) | Hamdy Abdelwahab (EGY) |
| Teia Mweia (SOL) | Fall (0-5) | Adil Al-Abedi (IRQ) |
| Lucas Sheridan (USA) | 1-2 (3–0, 0-3, 0-1) | Hamdy Abdelwahab (EGY) |
| Teia Mweia (SOL) | Fall (0-7) | Hamdy Abdelwahab (EGY) |
| Lucas Sheridan (USA) | Fall (4–0) | Adil Al-Abedi (IRQ) |

=== Group B ===
| Athlete | Pld | C. Points | T. Points |
|---|---|---|---|
| Ruslan Adzhigov (RUS) | 3 | 9 | 24 |
| Ruslan Kamilov (UZB) | 3 | 7 | 17 |
| Varos Petrosyan (ARM) | 3 | 5 | 4 |
| Junhyeong Choi (KOR) | 3 | 2 | 4 |

| Varos Petrosyan (ARM) | 1-2 (0-6, 1–0, 0-1) | Ruslan Adzhigov (RUS) |
| Junhyeong Choi (KOR) | 1-2 (0-6, 2–0, 0-1) | Ruslan Kamilov (UZB) |
| Varos Petrosyan (ARM) | Fall (3–0) | Junhyeong Choi (KOR) |
| Ruslan Adzhigov (RUS) | 2-0 (2–0, 3–1) | Ruslan Kamilov (UZB) |
| Varos Petrosyan (ARM) | 0-2 (0-3, 0-6) | Ruslan Kamilov (UZB) |
| Ruslan Adzhigov (RUS) | 2-0 (6–0, 6–2) | Junhyeong Choi (KOR) |

== Classification ==
=== 7th-place match ===
| Teia Mweia (SOL) | 0-2 (w/o) | Junhyeong Choi (KOR) |

=== 5th-place match ===
| Adil Al-Abedi (IRQ) | 0-2 (1-7, 0-1) | Varos Petrosyan (ARM) |

=== Bronze-medal match ===
| Lucas Sheridan (USA) | 1-2 (0-5, 4–3, 0-2) | Ruslan Kamilov (UZB) |

=== Gold-medal match ===
| Hamdy Abdelwahab (EGY) | Fall (0-1, 0-2) | Ruslan Adzhigov (RUS) |

== Final rankings ==
| Rank | Athlete |
|---|---|
| Gold medal | Ruslan Adzhigov (RUS) |
| Silver medal | Hamdy Abdelwahab (EGY) |
| Bronze medal | Ruslan Kamilov (UZB) |
| 4 | Lucas Sheridan (USA) |
| 5 | Varos Petrosyan (ARM) |
| 6 | Adil Al-Abedi (IRQ) |
| 7 | Junhyeong Choi (KOR) |
| 8 | Teia Mweia (SOL) |
