= North Korea at the 2010 Summer Youth Olympics =

- IOC code: PRK
- NOC: Olympic Committee of the Democratic People's Republic of Korea

in Singapore
- Competitors: 11 in 5 sports
- Flag bearer: Hyon Song Chol
- Medals Ranked 40th: Gold 1 Silver 1 Bronze 3 Total 5

Summer Youth Olympics appearances
- 2010; 2014; 2018

North Korea participated in the 2010 Summer Youth Olympics in Singapore.

== Medalists ==
Medal	Name	Sport	Event	Date
Gold	Kim Song-chol	Weightlifting	Men's 62kg	16 Aug
Silver	Hyon Song-chol	Judo	Boys' -66kg	21 Aug
Bronze	Kim Kuk-hyang	Weightlifting	Women's +63kg	18 Aug
Bronze	Sin Ji-hyang	Diving	Youth Women's 10m Platform	21 Aug
Bronze	Ri Un-ju	Judo	Girls' -52kg	21 Aug

== Athletics ==
=== Girls ===
Track and Road Events

Athletes	Event	Qualification		Final	
Athletes	Event	Result	Rank	Result	Rank
Ko Yong-sim	Girls’ 3000m	9:59.35	8 Q	10:20.44	10

== Diving ==
Boys

Athlete	Event	Preliminary		Final	
Athlete	Event	Points	Rank	Points	Rank
Hyon Il-myong	Boys’ 10m Platform	425.60	7 Q	469.85	6

Girls

Athlete	Event	Preliminary		Final	
Athlete	Event	Points	Rank	Points	Rank
Sin Ji-hyang	Girls’ 10m Platform	386.20	5 Q	430.20	Bronze medal

== Judo ==
Individual

Athlete	Event	Round 1	Round 2	Round 3	Semifinals	Final	Rank
Athlete	Event	Opposition Result	Opposition Result	Opposition Result	Opposition Result	Opposition Result	Rank
Hyon Song-chol	Boys' -66 kg	BYE	Arends (ARU); W 110-000	Agibayev (KAZ); W 100-000	Orgonbayar (MGL); W 100-000	Schneider (USA); L 000-100	Silver medal
Ri Un-ju	Girls' -52 kg	Prince (NED); W 010-000	Gelldybayeva (TKM); W 020-000		Dmitrieva (RUS); L 001-100	Bronze-medal match Rasinska (POL); W 100-000	Bronze medal

Team

Team	Event	Round 1	Round 2	Semifinals	Final	Rank
Team	Event	Opposition Result	Opposition Result	Opposition Result	Opposition Result	Rank
Birmingham; Fahariya Takidine (COM); Ecaterina Guica (CAN); Hyon Song-chol (PRK); Neo Kapenko (BOT); Chin Jie Lim (SIN); Kadijah Maxwell (BAR); Krisztian Toth (HUN)	Mixed Team	Cairo; L 2-5	Did not advance			9
Munich; Vita Valnova (BLR); Kęstutis Vitkauskas (LTU); Ri Un-ju (PRK); Beka Tugushi (GEO); Jalil Jalilov (AZE); Caren Chammas (LIB); Yacov Mamistvalov (ISR)	Mixed Team	Essen; L 3-4	Did not advance			9

== Swimming ==
Athletes	Event	Heat		Semifinal		Final	
Athletes	Event	Time	Position	Time	Position	Time	Position
Yun Chun-il	Boys’ 50m Breaststroke	DSQ		Did not advance			
Ho Kum-jong	Girls’ 50m Breaststroke	37.10	21	Did not advance			
Ho Kum-jong	Girls’ 100m Breaststroke	DNS		Did not advance			

== Table tennis ==
Table tennis at the 2010 Youth Summer Olympics

Individual

Athlete	Event	Round 1		Round 2		Quarterfinals	Semifinals	Final	Rank
Athlete	Event	Group Matches	Rank	Group Matches	Rank	Quarterfinals	Semifinals	Final	Rank
Kim Kwang-song	Boys' Singles	Lakatos (HUN); L 2-3 (8-11, 11-7, 13-11, 6-11, 10-12)	2 Q	Vanrossomme (BEL); L 1-3 (14-12, 6-11, 1-11, 8-11)	4	Did not advance			13
Kim Kwang-song	Boys' Singles	Tapia (ECU); W 3-0 (11-9, 13-11, 11-7)	2 Q	Bajger (CZE); L 0-3 (8-11, 8-11, 9-11)	4	Did not advance			13
Kim Kwang-song	Boys' Singles	Bedair (EGY); W 3-2 (3-11, 10-12, 11-6, 11-8, 11-5)	2 Q	Hung (TPE); L 0-3 (7-11, 9-11, 9-11)	4	Did not advance			13
Kim Song-i	Girls' Singles	BYE	1 Q	Xiao (POR); W 3-1 (7-11, 11-1, 11-9, 13-11)	2 Q	Gu (CHN); L 3-4 (11-13, 12-10, 8-11, 11-8, 11-8, 7-11, 6-11)	Did not advance		5
Kim Song-i	Girls' Singles	Gu (CHN); W 3-2 (11-8, 6-11, 12-10, 3-11, 11-9)	1 Q	Ng (HKG); W 3-1 (12-10, 9-11, 11-6, 11-9)	2 Q	Gu (CHN); L 3-4 (11-13, 12-10, 8-11, 11-8, 11-8, 7-11, 6-11)	Did not advance		5
Kim Song-i	Girls' Singles	Bhandarkar (IND); W 3-0 (11-6, 11-7, 11-7)	1 Q	Szocs (ROU); L 0-3 (9-11, 8-11, 8-11)	2 Q	Gu (CHN); L 3-4 (11-13, 12-10, 8-11, 11-8, 11-8, 7-11, 6-11)	Did not advance		5

Team

Athlete	Event	Round 1		Round 2	Quarterfinals	Semifinals	Final	Rank
Athlete	Event	Group Matches	Rank	Round 2	Quarterfinals	Semifinals	Final	Rank
DPR Korea; Kim Song-i (PRK); Kim Kwang-song (PRK)	Mixed Team	Intercontinental 1 Gu (CHN); Hmam (TUN); L 1-2 (1-3, 3-0, 2-3)	2 Q	France; Pang (FRA); Gauzy (FRA); W 2-0 (3-0, 3-0)	Europe 1 Szocs (ROU); Soderlund (SWE); W 2-1 (3-2, 0-3, 3-2)	Korea; Yang (KOR); Kim (KOR); L 0-2 (1-3, 1-3)	Intercontinental 1 Gu (CHN); Hmam (TUN); L 1-2 (0-3, 3-2, 1-3)	4
DPR Korea; Kim Song-i (PRK); Kim Kwang-song (PRK)	Mixed Team	Pan America 3 Rosheuvel (GUY); Tapia (ECU); W 3-0 (3-0, 3-0, 3-0)	2 Q	France; Pang (FRA); Gauzy (FRA); W 2-0 (3-0, 3-0)	Europe 1 Szocs (ROU); Soderlund (SWE); W 2-1 (3-2, 0-3, 3-2)	Korea; Yang (KOR); Kim (KOR); L 0-2 (1-3, 1-3)	Intercontinental 1 Gu (CHN); Hmam (TUN); L 1-2 (0-3, 3-2, 1-3)	4
DPR Korea; Kim Song-i (PRK); Kim Kwang-song (PRK)	Mixed Team	Netherlands; Britt Eerland (NED); Hageraats (NED); W 2-1 (3-0, 1-3, 3-1)	2 Q	France; Pang (FRA); Gauzy (FRA); W 2-0 (3-0, 3-0)	Europe 1 Szocs (ROU); Soderlund (SWE); W 2-1 (3-2, 0-3, 3-2)	Korea; Yang (KOR); Kim (KOR); L 0-2 (1-3, 1-3)	Intercontinental 1 Gu (CHN); Hmam (TUN); L 1-2 (0-3, 3-2, 1-3)	4

== Weightlifting ==
Athlete	Event	Snatch	Clean & jerk	Total	Rank
Kim Song-chol	Boys' 62kg	117	140	257	Gold medal
Kim Kuk-hyang	Girls' +63kg	106	138	244	Bronze medal
