= Nicaragua at the 2010 Summer Youth Olympics =

- IOC code: NCA
- NOC: Comité Olímpico Nicaragüense

in Singapore
- Competitors: 3 in 2 sports
- Flag bearer: Fabiola Espinoza

Summer Youth Olympics appearances
- 2010; 2014; 2018

Nicaragua competed at the 2010 Summer Youth Olympics, the inaugural Youth Olympic Games, held in Singapore from 14 August to 26 August 2010.

== Swimming ==
Athletes	Event	Heat		Semifinal		Final	
Athletes	Event	Time	Position	Time	Position	Time	Position
Cristofer Jimenez	Boys’ 100m Freestyle	1:02.32	50	Did not advance			
Cristofer Jimenez	Boys’ 100m Butterfly	1:07.64	33	Did not advance			
Fabiola Espinoza	Girls’ 50m Freestyle	28.90	41	Did not advance			
Fabiola Espinoza	Girls’ 200m Freestyle	2:24.21	41			Did not advance	

== Wrestling ==
Greco-Roman

Athlete	Event	Pools		Final	Rank
Athlete	Event	Groups	Rank	Final	Rank
Jose Gonzalez	Boys' 69kg	Nedashkouski (BLR); L 0–2 (0–6, 0–3)	4	7th Place Match; Darwish (SYR); L 0–2 (1–5, 0–3)	8
Jose Gonzalez	Boys' 69kg	Valor (COL); L Fall (0–5, 0–6)	4	7th Place Match; Darwish (SYR); L 0–2 (1–5, 0–3)	8
Jose Gonzalez	Boys' 69kg	Kandybayev (KAZ); L T. Fall (0–6, 0–7)	4	7th Place Match; Darwish (SYR); L 0–2 (1–5, 0–3)	8
