= Taekwondo at the 2018 Summer Youth Olympics – Boys' +73 kg =

Taekwondo competition

Boys' +73 kg at the III Summer Youth Olympic Games
- Venue: Oceania Pavilion
- Date: 11 October
- Competitors: 8 from 8 nations

Medalists
1st place, gold medalist(s)		Mohammad Ali Khosravi	Iran
2nd place, silver medalist(s)		Lee Meng-en	Chinese Taipei
3rd place, bronze medalist(s)		Ethan McClymont	Canada
3rd place, bronze medalist(s)		Nisar Ahmad Abdul Rahimzai	Afghanistan

The boys' +73 kg kg competition at the 2018 Summer Youth Olympics was held on 11 October at the Oceania Pavilion.

== Schedule ==
All times are in local time (UTC-3).

Date	Time	Round
Thursday, 11 October 2018	14:15; 19:15; 20:15	Quarterfinals; Semifinals; Final

== Bracket ==
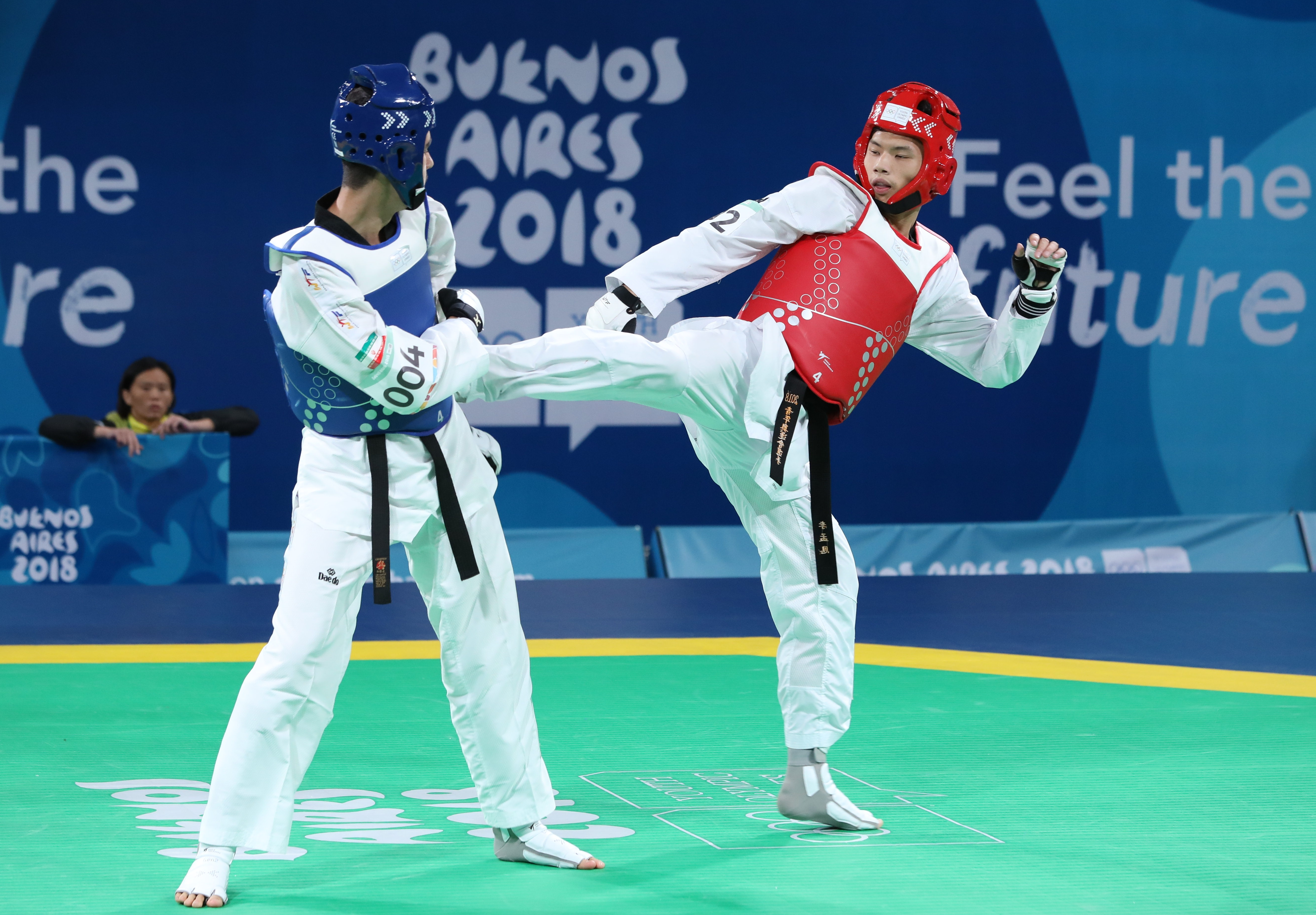
Final: Mohammad Ali Khosravi vs. Lee Meng-en

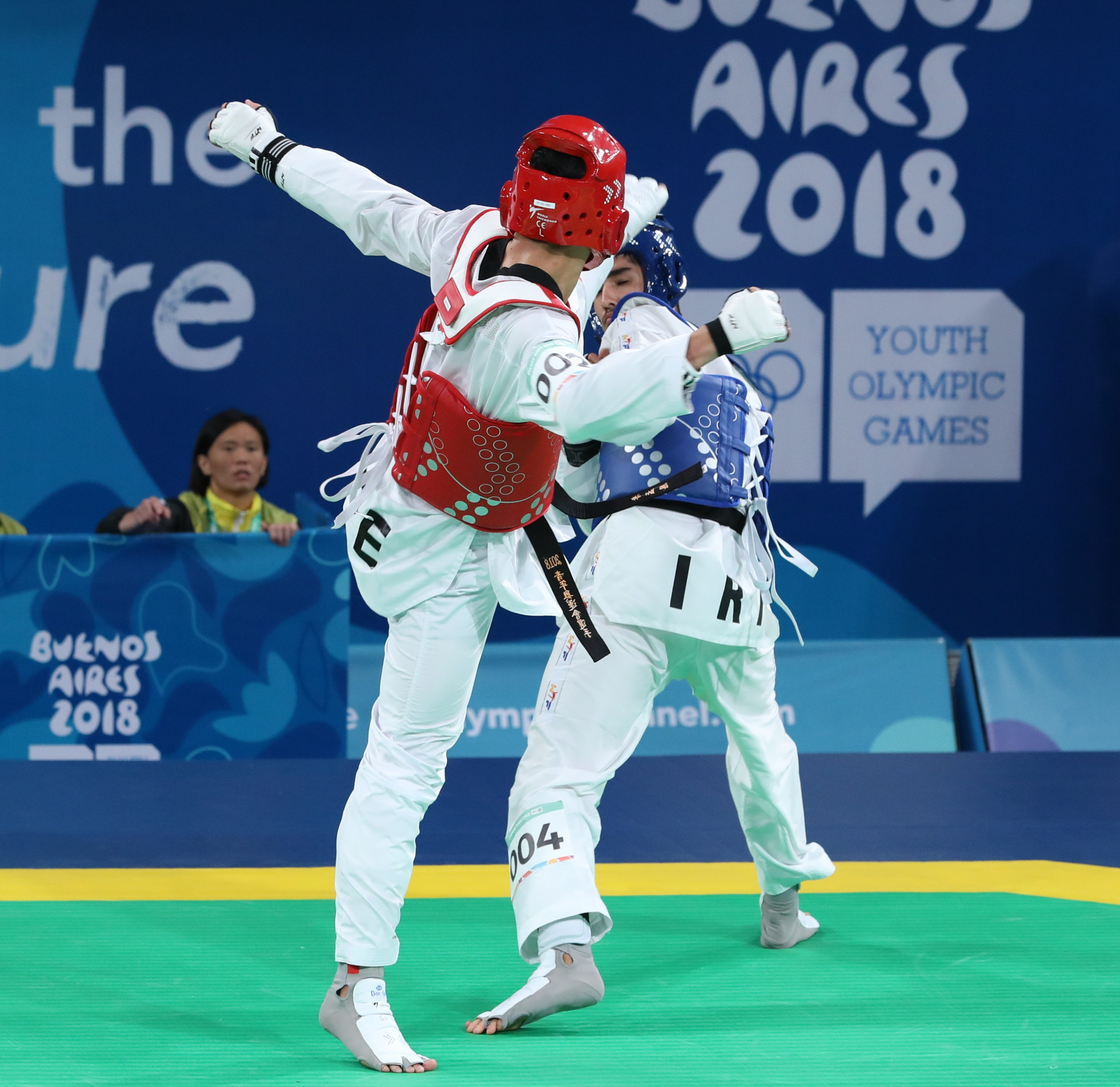
Final: Mohammad Ali Khosravi vs. Lee Meng-en

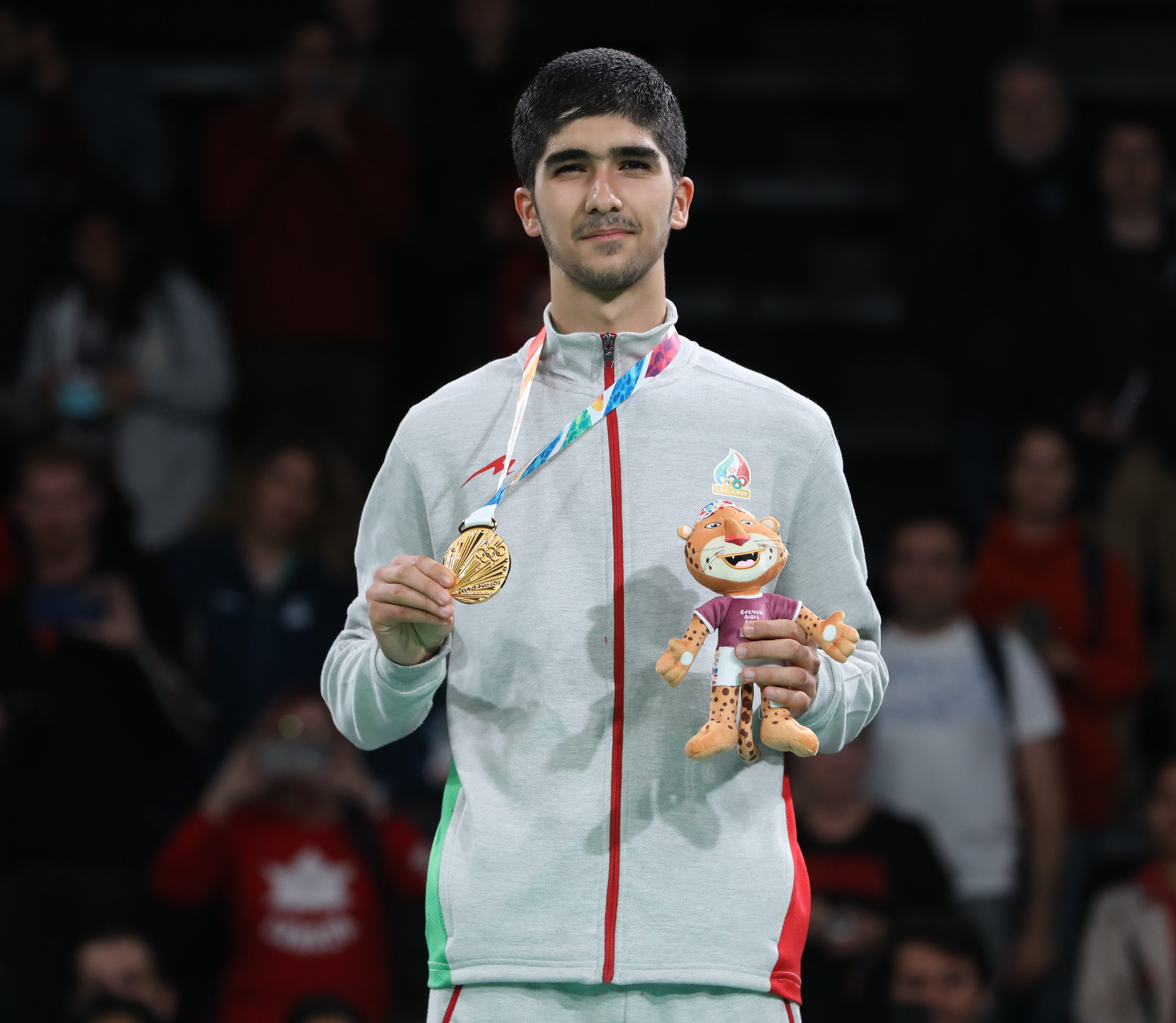
Mohammad Ali Khosravi (Youth Olympic Games Champion)

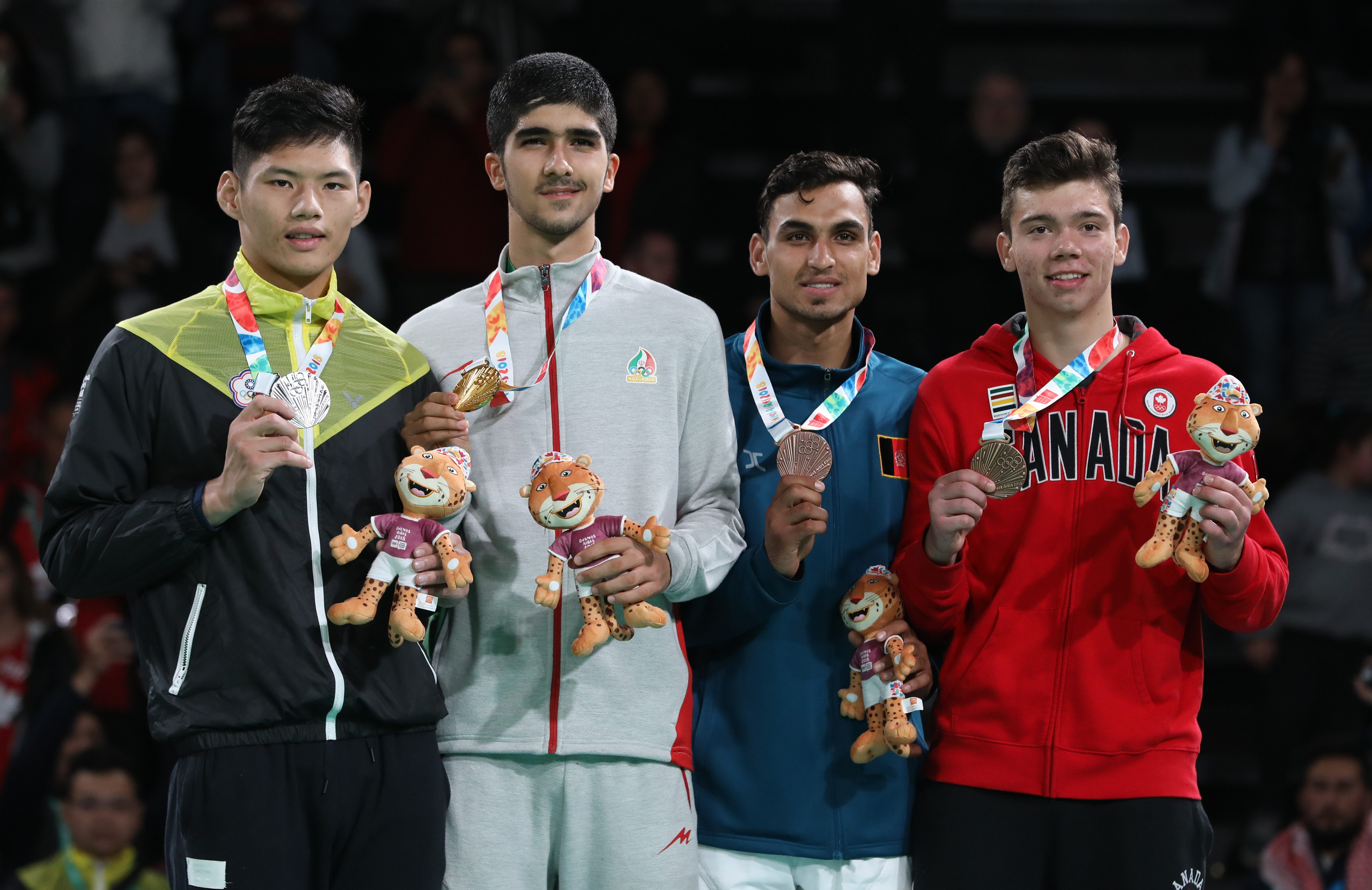
Victory ceremony

Quarterfinals
1	Abdelrahman Mohamed Khalaf (EGY)	25
8	Nisar Ahmad Abdul Rahimzai (AFG)	29
5	Nik Auguštin (SLO)	11
4	Mohammad Ali Khosravi (IRI)	16
3	Ethan McClymont (CAN)	12
6	Milos Pilipovic (NOR)	11
7	Jakub Sadurski (POL)	2
2	Lee Meng-en (TPE)	10

Semifinals
8	Nisar Ahmad Abdul Rahimzai (AFG)	16
4	Mohammad Ali Khosravi (IRI)	19
3	Ethan McClymont (CAN)	7
2	Lee Meng-en (TPE)	15

Gold medal match
4	Mohammad Ali Khosravi (IRI)	2
2	Lee Meng-en (TPE)	1
