= Weightlifting at the 2010 Summer Youth Olympics – Boys' 62 kg =

The boys' 62 kg weightlifting event was the second men's event at the weightlifting competition at the 2010 Summer Youth Olympics, with competitors limited to a maximum of 62 kilograms of body mass. The whole competition took place on August 15 at 14:30.

Each lifter performed in both the snatch and clean and jerk lifts, with the final score being the sum of the lifter's best result in each. The athlete received three attempts in each of the two lifts; the score for the lift was the heaviest weight successfully lifted.

== Medalists ==
Gold	Kim Song-chol; North Korea	257 kg
Silver	José Mena; Colombia	247 kg
Bronze	Emre Büyükünlü; Turkey	246 kg

== Results ==
Rank	Name	Group	Body Weight	Snatch (kg)				Clean & Jerk (kg)				Total (kg)
Rank	Name	Group	Body Weight	1	2	3	Res	1	2	3	Res	Total (kg)
1st place, gold medalist(s)	Kim Song-chol (PRK)	A	61.83	113	117	~~121~~	117	137	140	~~145~~	140	257
2nd place, silver medalist(s)	José Mena (COL)	A	61.75	~~107~~	~~107~~	107	107	133	136	140	140	247
3rd place, bronze medalist(s)	Emre Büyükünlü (TUR)	A	61.75	108	111	~~113~~	111	130	~~134~~	135	135	246
4	Nguyễn Thiên Quốc (VIE)	A	56.21	~~105~~	105	109	109	124	130	~~133~~	130	239
5	Zainudin Zainudin (INA)	A	61.05	100	~~105~~	107	107	~~132~~	132	~~137~~	132	239
6	René Pizango (ECU)	A	60.79	95	100	103	103	130	~~134~~	135	135	238
7	Charles Ssekyaaya (UGA)	A	61.40	97	101	~~105~~	101	132	~~136~~	136	136	237
8	Patryk Słowikowski (POL)	A	61.94	100	~~103~~	~~103~~	100	~~123~~	123	~~125~~	123	223
9	Baýmyrat Orazdurdyýew (TKM)	A	61.17	96	101	~~105~~	101	121	~~126~~	~~126~~	121	222
10	Mohsen Al-Duhaylib (KSA)	A	61.37	98	~~104~~	~~104~~	98	121	~~125~~	~~125~~	121	219
11	Michael Taufa (TGA)	A	61.53	87	92	97	97	113	120	~~124~~	120	217
