= Iraq at the 2010 Summer Youth Olympics =

- IOC code: IRQ
- NOC: National Olympic Committee of Iraq

in Singapore
- Competitors: 5 in 4 sports
- Flag bearer: Mahmood Khaleel Sabaawi
- Medals: Gold 0 Silver 0 Bronze 0 Total 0

Summer Youth Olympics appearances (overview)
- 2010; 2014; 2018

Iraq participated in the 2010 Summer Youth Olympics in Singapore.

The Iraqi squad consisted of five athletes competing in four sports: aquatics (swimming), fencing, weightlifting and wrestling.

== Fencing ==
Athlete	Event	Pool Round			Round of 16	Quarterfinals	Semifinals	Gold Medal Final	
Athlete	Event	Group	Score	Rank	Opposition Result	Opposition Result	Opposition Result	Opposition Result	Total Rank
Ema Hilwiyah	Girls' Sabre	C. Merza (USA); Y. Wan (CHN); G. Nyabileke (COD); A. Musch (GER); A. Wator (POL); A. Komaschuk (UKR)	L 0-5; L 4-5; W 5-4; L 0-5; L 0-5; L 0-5	6th Q	Y. Wan (CHN); L 1–15	Did not advance			12th

== Swimming ==
Athlete	Events	Heat		Semifinal		Final	
Athlete	Events	Time	Rank	Time	Rank	Time	Rank
Ahmed Salam Al-Dulaimi	Boys' 50m freestyle	26.09	33rd	Did not advance			
Ahmed Salam Al-Dulaimi	Boys' 100m freestyle	56.09	43rd	Did not advance			

== Weightlifting ==
Athlete	Event	Snatch	Clean & Jerk	Total	Rank
Mahmood Khaleel Sabaawi	Boys' +85kg	137	166	303	5th

== Wrestling ==
Greco-Roman

Athlete	Event	Pools		Final 5–6	Rank
Athlete	Event	Groups	Rank	Final 5–6	Rank
Sarmad Mohsin	Boys' -50kg	Did not start			
Adil Al-Abedi	Boys' 85kg	Mweia (SOL); W Fall (5–0)	3	5th Place Match; Petrosyan (ARM); L 0–2 (1–7, 0–1)	6
Adil Al-Abedi	Boys' 85kg	Abdelwahab (EGY); L 0–2 (0–1, 1–3)	3	5th Place Match; Petrosyan (ARM); L 0–2 (1–7, 0–1)	6
Adil Al-Abedi	Boys' 85kg	Sheridan (USA); L Fall (0–4)	3	5th Place Match; Petrosyan (ARM); L 0–2 (1–7, 0–1)	6
