= Solomon Islands at the 2010 Summer Youth Olympics =

- IOC code: SOL
- NOC: Solomon Islands Olympic Committee

in Singapore
- Competitors: 3 in 2 sports
- Flag bearer: Teia Mweia
- Medals: Gold 0 Silver 0 Bronze 0 Total 0

Summer Youth Olympics appearances
- 2010; 2014; 2018

The Solomon Islands participated in the 2010 Summer Youth Olympics in Singapore.

== Athletics ==
Note: The athletes who do not have a "Q" next to their Qualification Rank advance to a non-medal ranking final.

=== Boys ===
Track and Road Events

Athletes	Event	Qualification		Final	
Athletes	Event	Result	Rank	Result	Rank
Stanley Sipolo	Boys’ 400m	54.53	24 qD	DNS	

=== Girls ===
Track and Road Events

Athletes	Event	Qualification		Final	
Athletes	Event	Result	Rank	Result	Rank
Noelyn Kukapi	Girls’ 200m	31.49	19 qC	DNS	

== Wrestling ==
Greco-Roman

Athlete	Event	Pools		Final	Rank
Athlete	Event	Groups	Rank	Final	Rank
Teia Mweia	Boys' 85kg	Sheridan (USA); L Fall (0–5)	4	7th Place Match; Choi (KOR); L 0–2 (wd)	8
Teia Mweia	Boys' 85kg	Al-Abedi (IRQ); L Fall (0–5)	4	7th Place Match; Choi (KOR); L 0–2 (wd)	8
Teia Mweia	Boys' 85kg	Abdelwahab (EGY); L Fall (0–7)	4	7th Place Match; Choi (KOR); L 0–2 (wd)	8
