= Weightlifting at the 2010 Summer Youth Olympics – Girls' +63 kg =

The girls' +63 kg weightlifting event was the fifth and last women's event at the weightlifting competition at the 2010 Summer Youth Olympics, with competitors with at least 63 kg, there was no maximum limit . The whole competition took place on August 18 at 14:30.

Each lifter performed in both the snatch and clean and jerk lifts, with the final score being the sum of the lifter's best result in each. The athlete received three attempts in each of the two lifts; the score for the lift was the heaviest weight successfully lifted.

== Medalists ==
Gold	Olga Zubova; Russia	251 kg
Silver	Chitchanok Pulsabsakul; Thailand	251 kg
Bronze	Kim Kuk-hyang; North Korea	244 kg

== Results ==
Rank	Name	Group	Body Weight	Snatch (kg)				Clean & Jerk (kg)				Total (kg)
Rank	Name	Group	Body Weight	1	2	3	Res	1	2	3	Res	Total (kg)
1st place, gold medalist(s)	Olga Zubova (RUS)	A	71.59	105	110	112	112	135	139	~~143~~	143	251
2nd place, silver medalist(s)	Chitchanok Pulsabsakul (THA)	A	119.89	108	112	115	115	132	136	~~142~~	136	251
3rd place, bronze medalist(s)	Kim Kuk-hyang (PRK)	A	87.11	100	~~106~~	106	106	138	~~140~~	~~140~~	138	244
4	Yao Chi-Ling (TPE)	A	81.37	97	100	~~103~~	100	127	~~133~~	133	133	233
5	Andreea Aanei (ROU)	A	102.56	93	98	102	102	120	125	~~130~~	125	227
6	Park Yoon Hee (KOR)	A	103.53	98	102	~~106~~	102	~~125~~	~~125~~	125	125	227
7	Tetyana Syrota (UKR)	A	73.88	85	89	~~92~~	89	105	110	113	113	202
8	Iuniarra Simanu (SAM)	A	96.16	80	~~85~~	85	85	105	~~110~~	~~110~~	105	190
9	Milena Kruczynska (POL)	A	69.21	79	~~82~~	82	82	101	~~106~~	106	106	188
10	Ganna Pustovarova (UZB)	A	104.88	~~83~~	83	~~87~~	83	~~100~~	~~100~~	100	100	183
11	Prabdeep Sanghera (CAN)	A	69.25	~~78~~	78	82	82	93	~~97~~	~~97~~	93	175
12	Miku Shichinohe (JPN)	A	72.44	75	~~79~~	80	80	85	90	93	93	173
	Carlotta Brunelli (ITA)	A	74.91	80	~~85~~	85	85	~~90~~	~~90~~	~~90~~	–	–
