= Weightlifting at the 2010 Summer Youth Olympics – Boys' +85 kg =

The boys' +85 kg weightlifting event was the sixth and last men's event at the weightlifting competition at the 2010 Summer Youth Olympics, with competitors at least 85 kg, with no maximum limit. The whole competition took place on August 19 at 11:00.

Each lifter performed in both the snatch and clean and jerk lifts, with the final score being the sum of the lifter's best result in each. The athlete received three attempts in each of the two lifts; the score for the lift was the heaviest weight successfully lifted.

== Medalists ==
| Gold | Alireza Kazeminejad; Iran | 351 kg |
| Silver | Gor Minasyan; Armenia | 350 kg |
| Bronze | Hassan Mohamed; Egypt | 330 kg |

== Results ==
| Rank | Name | Group | Body Weight | Snatch (kg) | | | | Clean & Jerk (kg) | | | | Total (kg) |
| Rank | Name | Group | Body Weight | 1 | 2 | 3 | Res | 1 | 2 | 3 | Res | Total (kg) |
|---|---|---|---|---|---|---|---|---|---|---|---|---|
| 1st place, gold medalist(s) | Alireza Kazeminejad (IRI) | A | 155.82 | 148 | 155 | ~~160~~ | 155 | 190 | 196 | - | 196 | 351 |
| 2nd place, silver medalist(s) | Gor Minasyan (ARM) | A | 123.02 | ~~155~~ | 155 | 160 | 160 | ~~190~~ | 190 | ~~195~~ | 190 | 350 |
| 3rd place, bronze medalist(s) | Hassan Mohamed (EGY) | A | 102.19 | 140 | 145 | 150 | 150 | 170 | 180 | ~~185~~ | 180 | 330 |
| 4 | Melih Akin (TUR) | A | 94.46 | ~~132~~ | 132 | ~~135~~ | 132 | 167 | 172 | 177 | 177 | 309 |
| 5 | MK Sabaawi (IRQ) | A | 96.47 | 130 | 133 | 137 | 137 | ~~160~~ | ~~160~~ | 160 | 160 | 303 |
| 6 | Moises Sotelo (MEX) | A | 119.99 | ~~125~~ | 125 | 132 | 132 | 157 | ~~166~~ | ~~166~~ | 157 | 289 |
| 7 | Felipe Mansilla (GUA) | A | 140.11 | 100 | ~~105~~ | 105 | 105 | ~~118~~ | 118 | ~~127~~ | 118 | 223 |
