= Artak Hovhannisyan =

Armenian freestyle wrestler

Personal information
- Nationality: Armenia
- Born: Արտակ Հովհաննիսյան; 1 October 1993 (age 32) Armenia
- Height: 1.69 m (5 ft 6 1/2 in)
- Weight: 58 kg (128 lb)

Sport
- Country: Armenia
- Sport: Wrestling
- Event: Freestyle
- Club: Sport School Wrestling club Armavir
- Coached by: Armen Malkhasyan
Medal record
Men's freestyle Wrestling
Representing Armenia
Junior World Championships
Bronze medal – third place	2013 Sofia	55 kg
Junior European Championships
Silver medal – second place	2012 Zagreb	55 kg
Bronze medal – third place	2013 Skopje	55 kg
Youth Olympic Games
Bronze medal – third place	2010 Singapore	46 kg
Cadet European Championships
Gold medal – first place	2009 Zrenjanin	42 kg

Artak Hovhannisyan (Armenian: Արտակ Հովհաննիսյան, born 1 October 1993) is an Armenian Freestyle wrestler. He won the 2009 Cadet European Championship. Hovhannisyan competed at the 2010 Summer Youth Olympics in Singapore and won the bronze medal in the boys' freestyle 46 kg event, defeating Andry Davila of Venezuela in the bronze medal match.
