= Samoa at the 2010 Summer Youth Olympics =

- IOC code: SAM
- NOC: Samoa Association of Sports and National Olympic Committee Inc.

in Singapore
- Competitors: 3 in 3 sports
- Flag bearer: Iuniarra Simanu

Summer Youth Olympics appearances
- 2010; 2014; 2018

Samoa competed at the 2010 Summer Youth Olympics, the inaugural Youth Olympic Games, held in Singapore from 14 August to 26 August 2010.

== Athletics ==
=== Boys ===
Track and road events

Athletes	Event	Qualification		Final	
Athletes	Event	Result	Rank	Result	Rank
Emau Toluono	Boys' 100m	12.17	32 qE	12.17	29

== Swimming ==
Girls

Athletes	Event	Heat		Semifinal		Final	
Athletes	Event	Time	Position	Time	Position	Time	Position
Rohane Crichton	Girls' 50m Freestyle	31.74	52	did not advance			
Rohane Crichton	Girls' 50m Backstroke	35.30	20	did not advance			

== Weightlifting ==
Girls

Athlete	Event	Snatch	Clean & Jerk	Total	Rank
Iuniarra Simanu	+63kg	85	105	190	8
