= Ali Eshkevarian =

Iranian taekwondo athlete

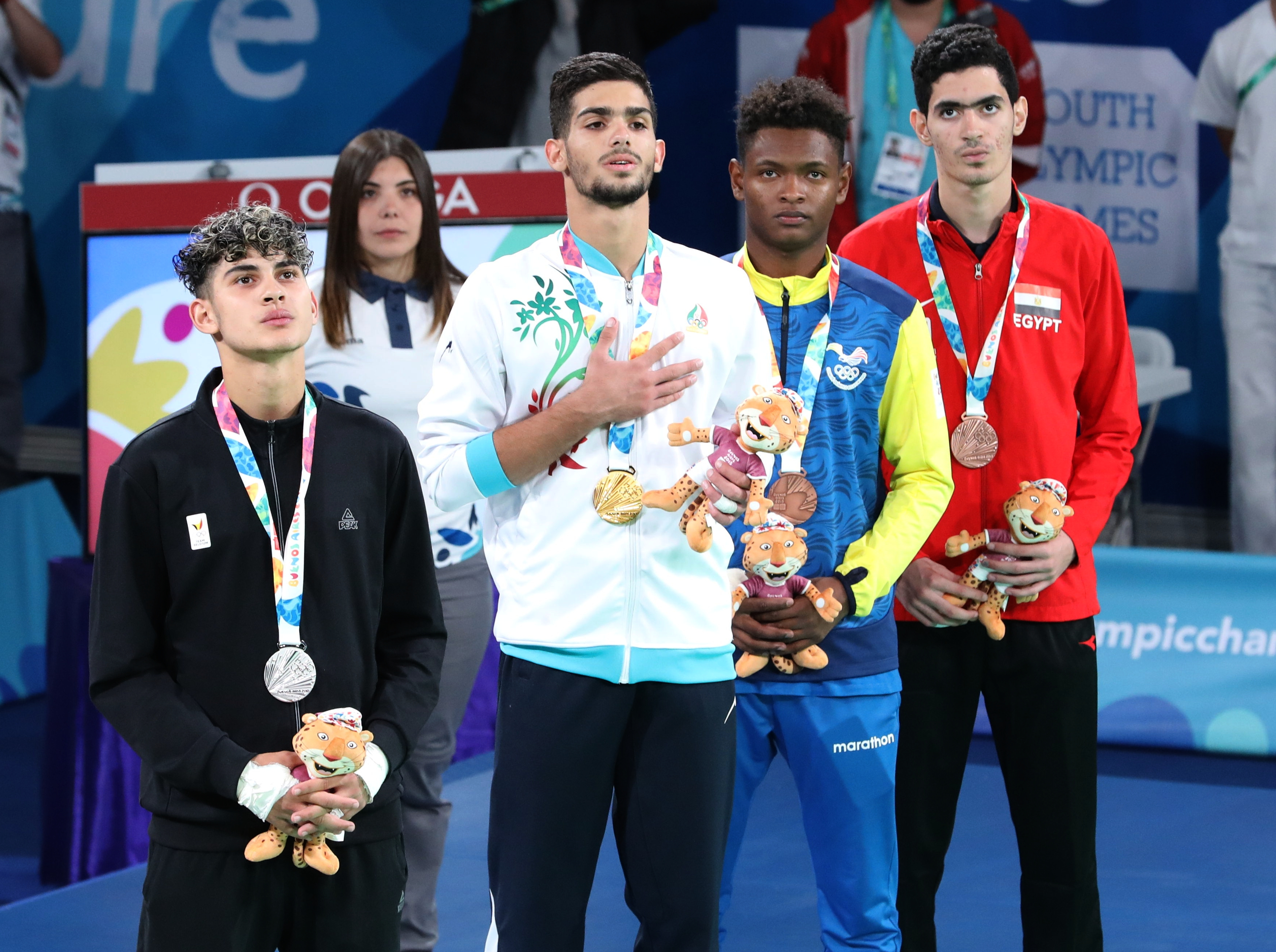
- Eshkevarian in 2018

Personal information
- Nationality: Iranian
- Born: March 13, 2001 (age 25)
- Height: 195 cm (6 ft 5 in)
- Weight: 75 kg (165 lb)

Sport
- Country: Iran
- Sport: Taekwondo
- Event: Kyorugi
- Team: Iran
Medal record
Representing Iran
Youth Olympic Games
Gold medal – first place	2018 Buenos Aires	73 kg

Ali Eshkevarian (born March 13, 2001, in Tonekabon) is an Iranian taekwondo athlete who competes in the sixth weight category globally and the third Olympic weight category. He is a student of Physical Education at the Islamic Azad University, Tonekabon branch. His achievements include winning championships at the World Junior Taekwondo Championships, the Youth Olympics, and the World Senior Taekwondo Championships. Ashkouriyan made history by winning Mazandaran's first-ever gold medal in the Olympics. His international career began in 2015.

== See also ==
- Youth Olympic Games
- Taekwondo at the 2018 Summer Youth Olympics
- World Taekwondo Junior Championships
