= Mohammad Ali Khosravi =

Iranian taekwondo athlete (born 2001)

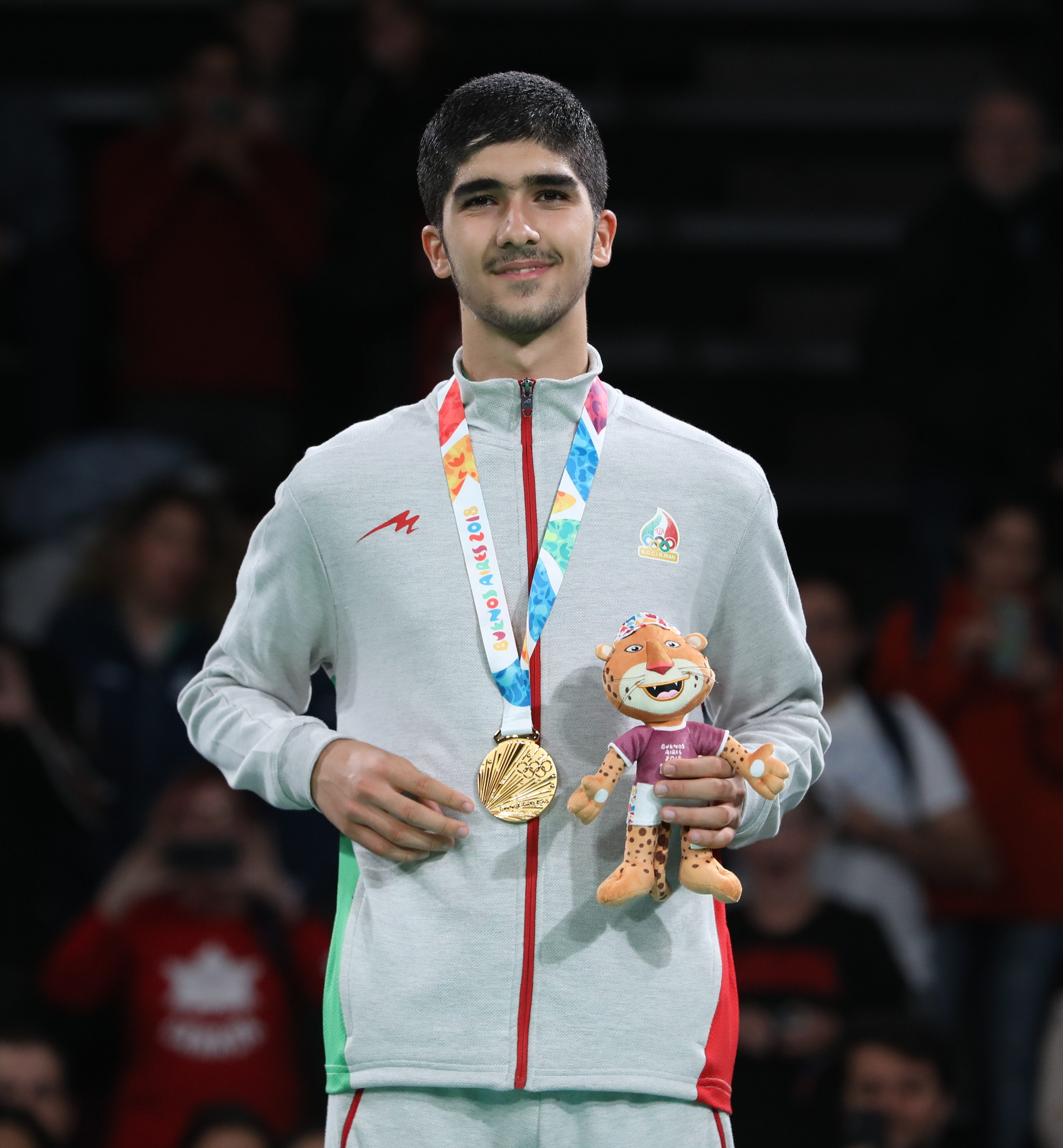

Personal information
- Nationality: Iranian
- Born: November 3, 2001 (age 24) Tehran, Iran
- Height: 198 cm (6.50 ft)
- Weight: 85 kg (187 lb)
- Website: www.instagram.com/mohammadali_khosraviii

Sport
- Country: Iran
- Sport: Taekwondo
- Event: Kyorugi
- Club: Farmanie
- Team: Iran
Medal record
Representing Iran
Youth Olympic Games
Gold medal – first place	2018 Buenos Aires	+73kg
Youth world championships
Gold medal – first place	2018 Hammamet	-78kg
Youth Tournament
Gold medal – first place	2017 Istanbul	-78kg
- Updated on 31 January 2021

Mohammad Ali Khosravi (Persian: محمد علی خسروی; born 3 November 2001) is an Iranian taekwondoka. He began taekwondo in 2010 under the supervision of Mehdi Mohammadzadeh, then in 2013 he became a member of the Iran national taekwondo team. Mohammad Ali Khosravi achieved the gold medal of the 2018 Summer Youth Olympics Games in Buenos Aires.

He also won a gold medal at the 2018 Youth World Championships.

== Medallists ==
Event	Gold	Silver	Bronze
Boys' +73 kg	Mohammad Ali Khosravi; Iran	Lee Meng-en; Chinese Taipei	Nisar Ahmad Abdul Rahimzai; Afghanistan
Boys' +73 kg	Mohammad Ali Khosravi; Iran	Lee Meng-en; Chinese Taipei	Ethan McClymont; Canada

== Braket ==
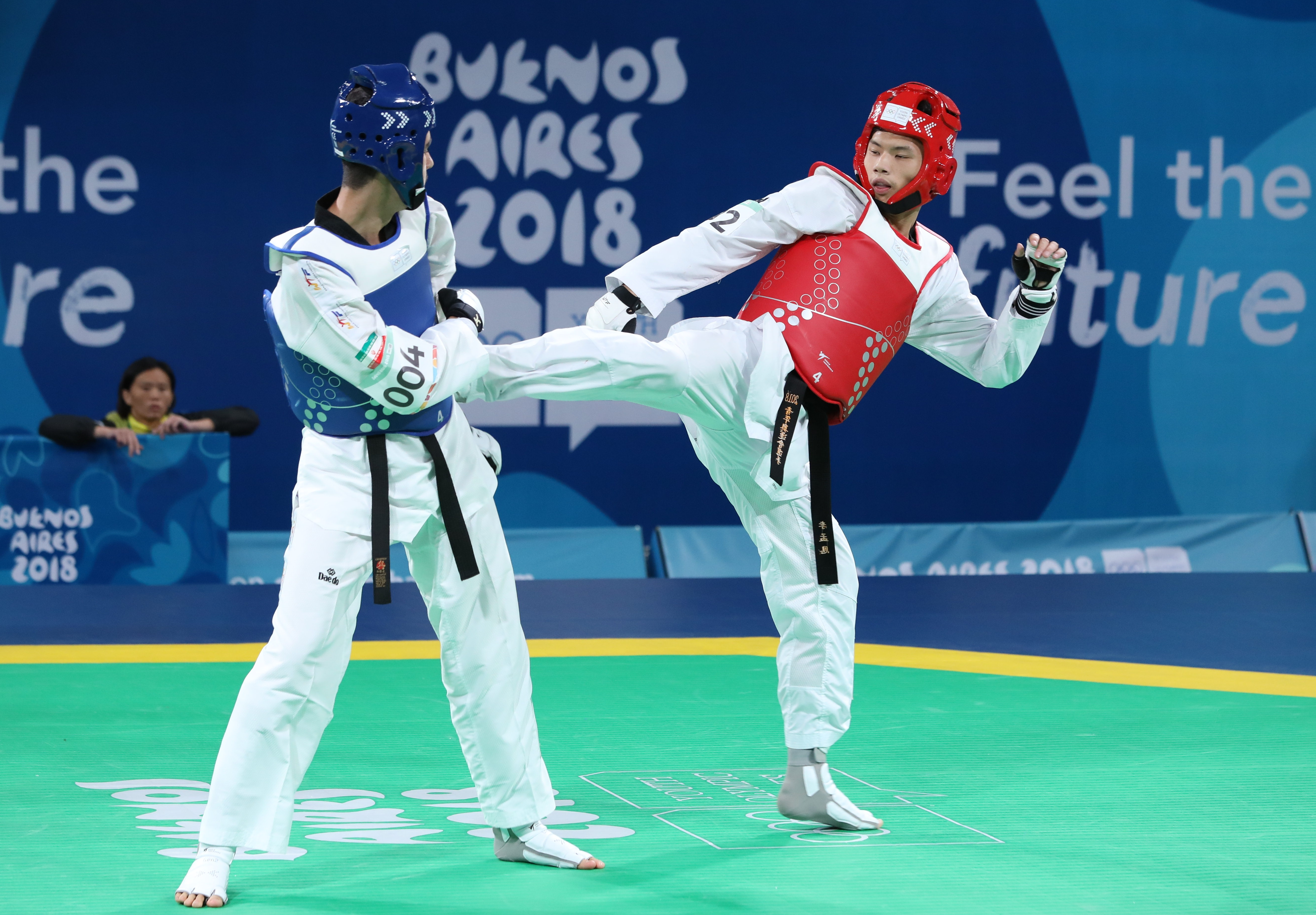
Final: Mohammad Ali Khosravi vs. Lee Meng-en

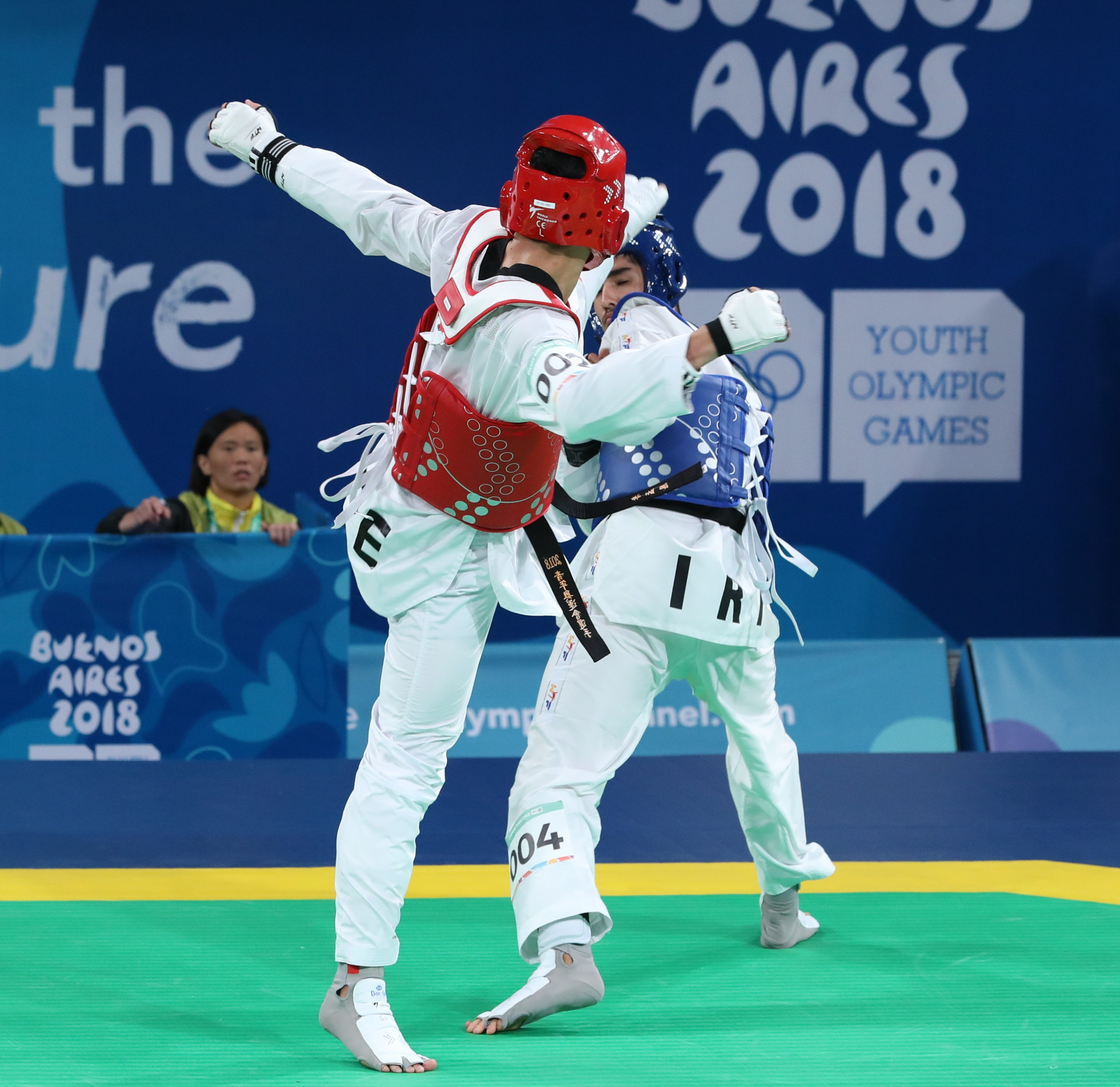
Final: Mohammad Ali Khosravi vs. Lee Meng-en

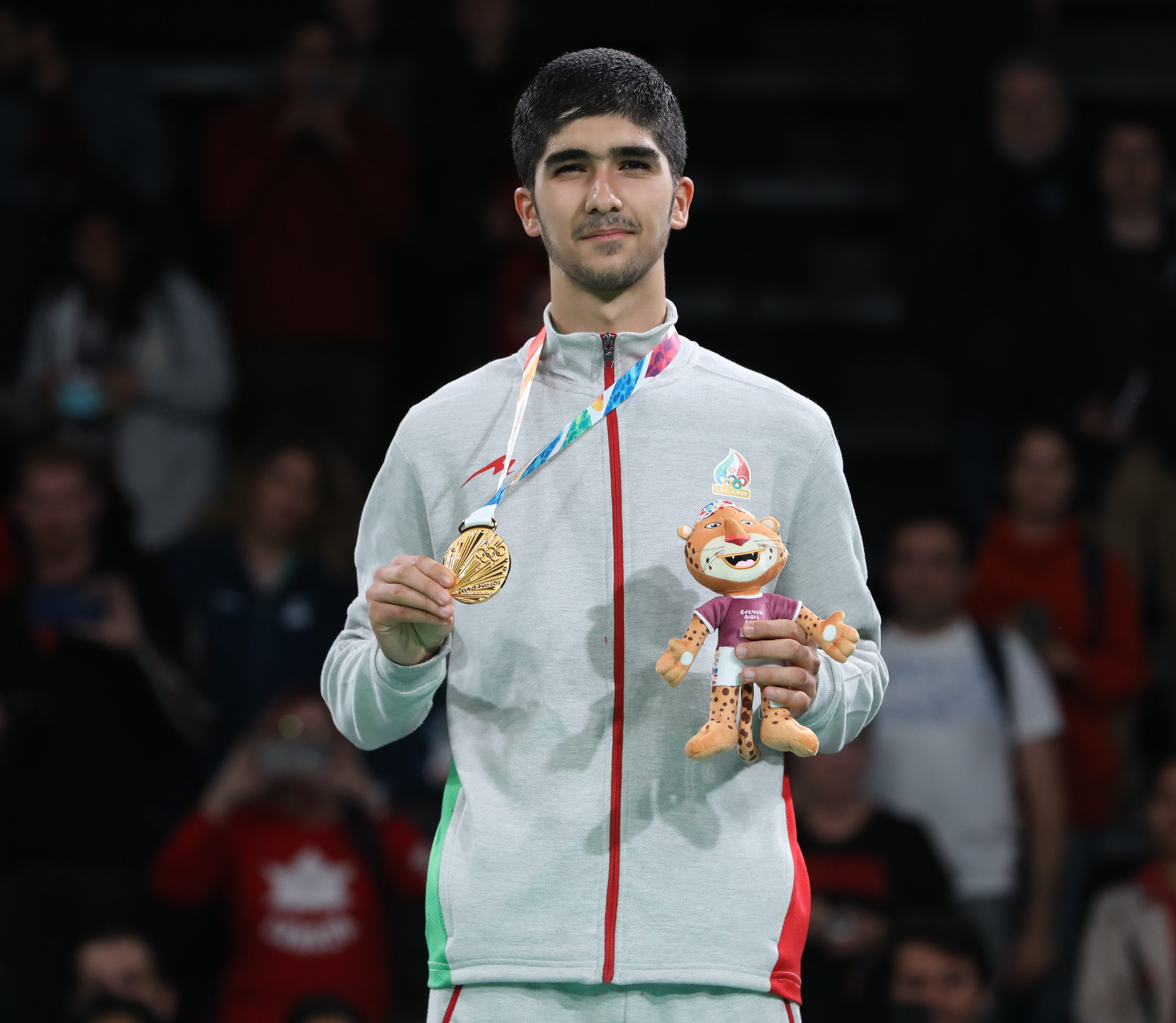
Mohammad Ali Khosravi (Youth Olympic Games Champion)

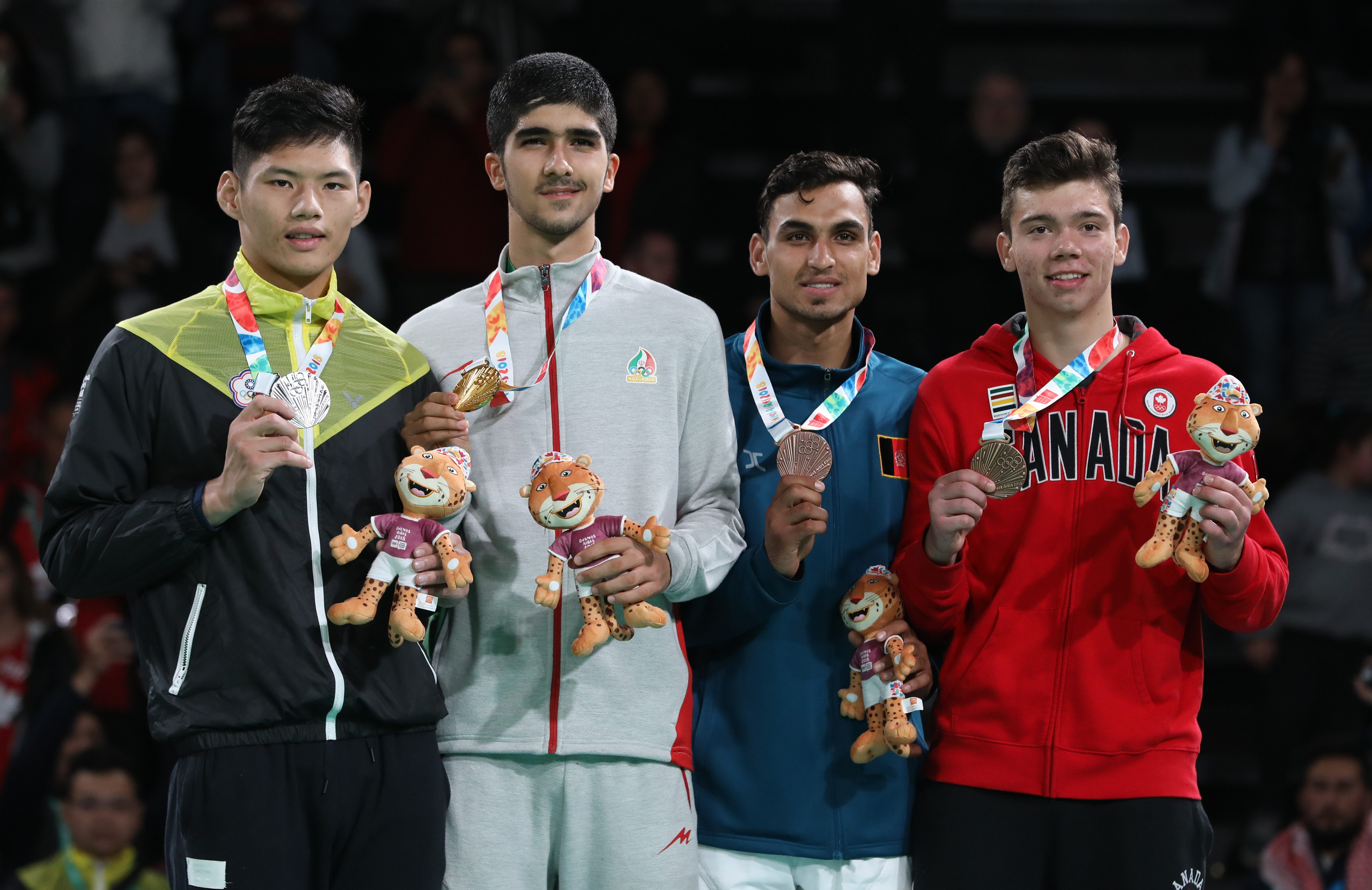
Victory ceremony

== See also ==
- Youth Olympic Games
- Taekwondo at the 2018 Summer Youth Olympics
- World Taekwondo Junior Championships
