= Taekwondo at the 2018 Summer Youth Olympics – Boys' 73 kg =

Taekwondo competition

Boys' 73 kg at the III Summer Youth Olympic Games
- Venue: Oceania Pavilion
- Date: 10 October
- Competitors: 10 from 10 nations

Medalists
| 1st place, gold medalist(s) | | Ali Eshkevarian | Iran |
| 2nd place, silver medalist(s) | | Badr Achab | Belgium |
| 3rd place, bronze medalist(s) | | Eyad Barakat | Egypt |
| 3rd place, bronze medalist(s) | | Darlyn Padilla | Ecuador |

The boys' 73 kg competition at the 2018 Summer Youth Olympics was held on 10 October at the Oceania Pavilion.

== Schedule ==
All times are in local time (UTC-3).

| Date | Time | Round |
|---|---|---|
| Wednesday, 10 October 2018 | 14:15; 15:30; 19:15; 20:15 | Round of 16; Quarterfinals; Semifinals; Final |

== Bracket ==
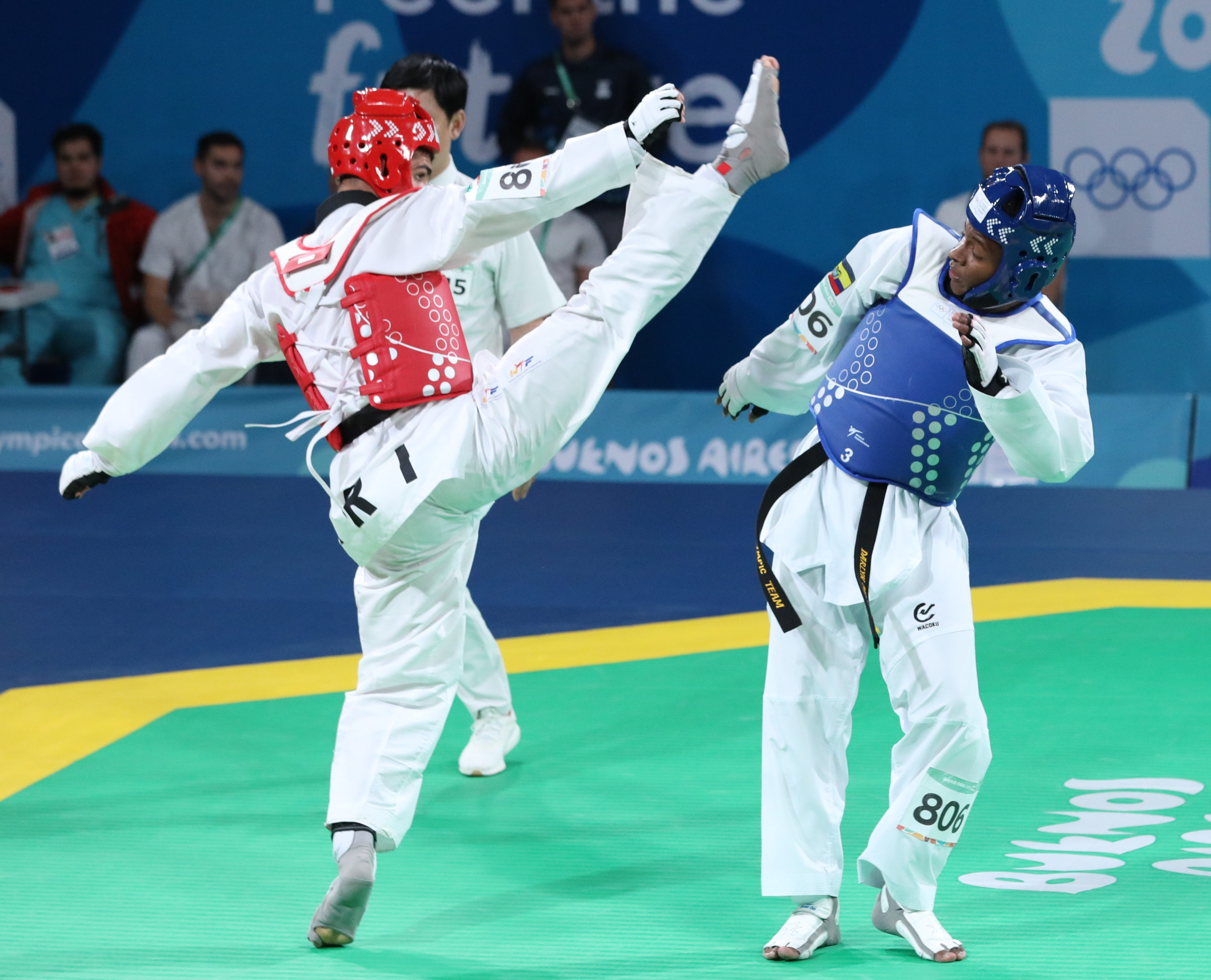
Semifinal: Darlyn Padilla vs. Ali Eshkevarian

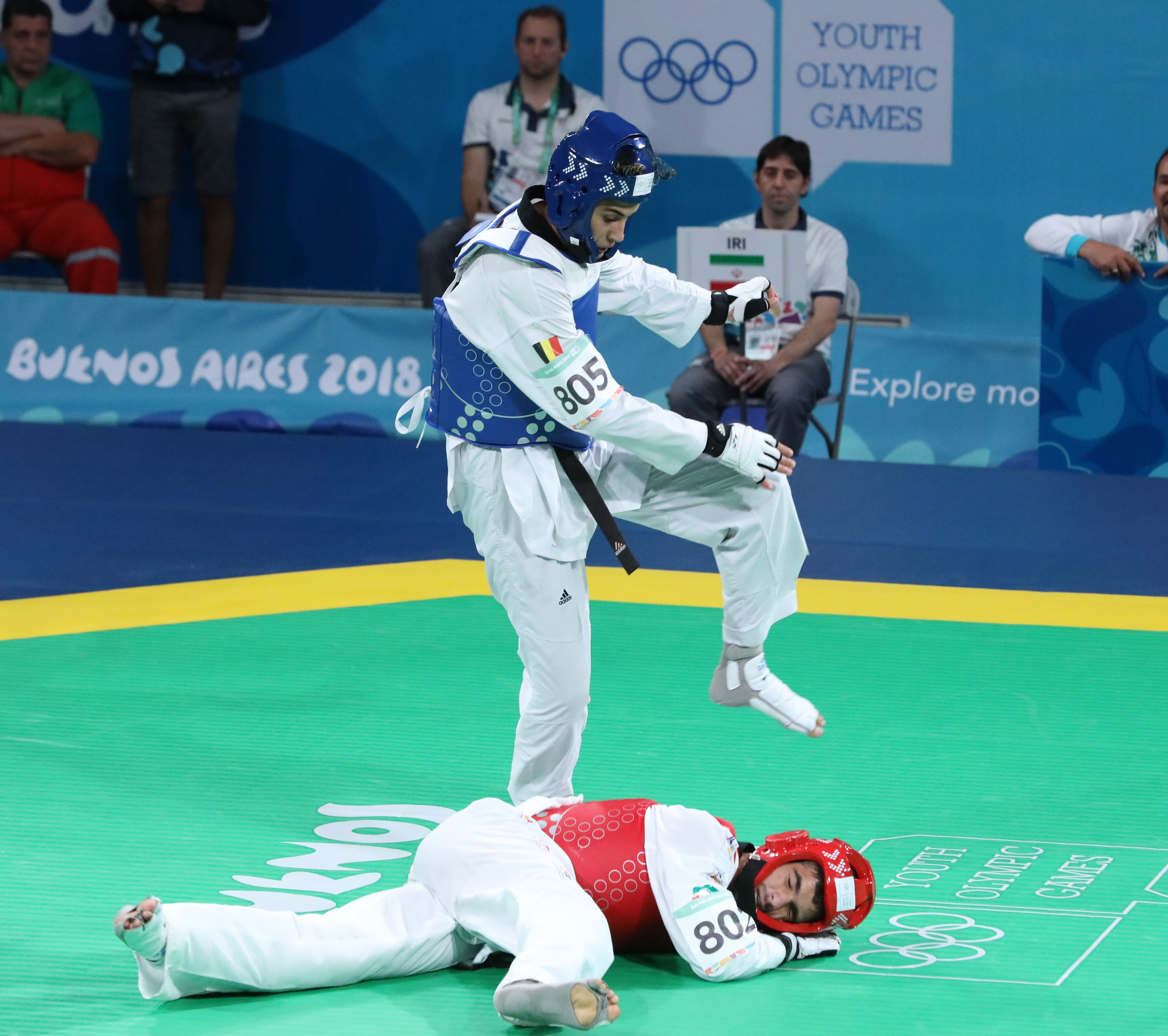
Final: Badr Achab vs. Ali Eshkevarian

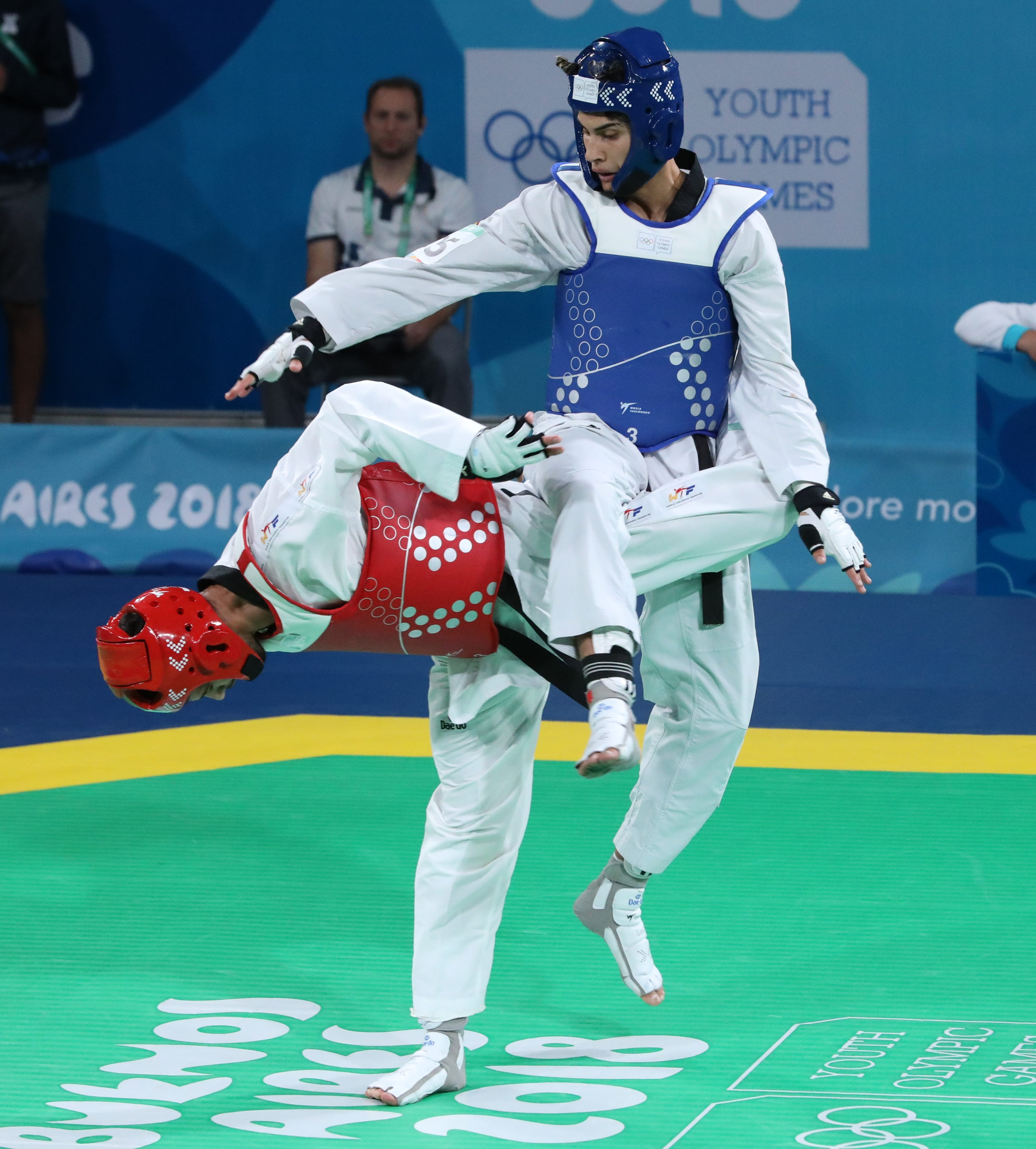
Final: Badr Achab vs. Ali Eshkevarian

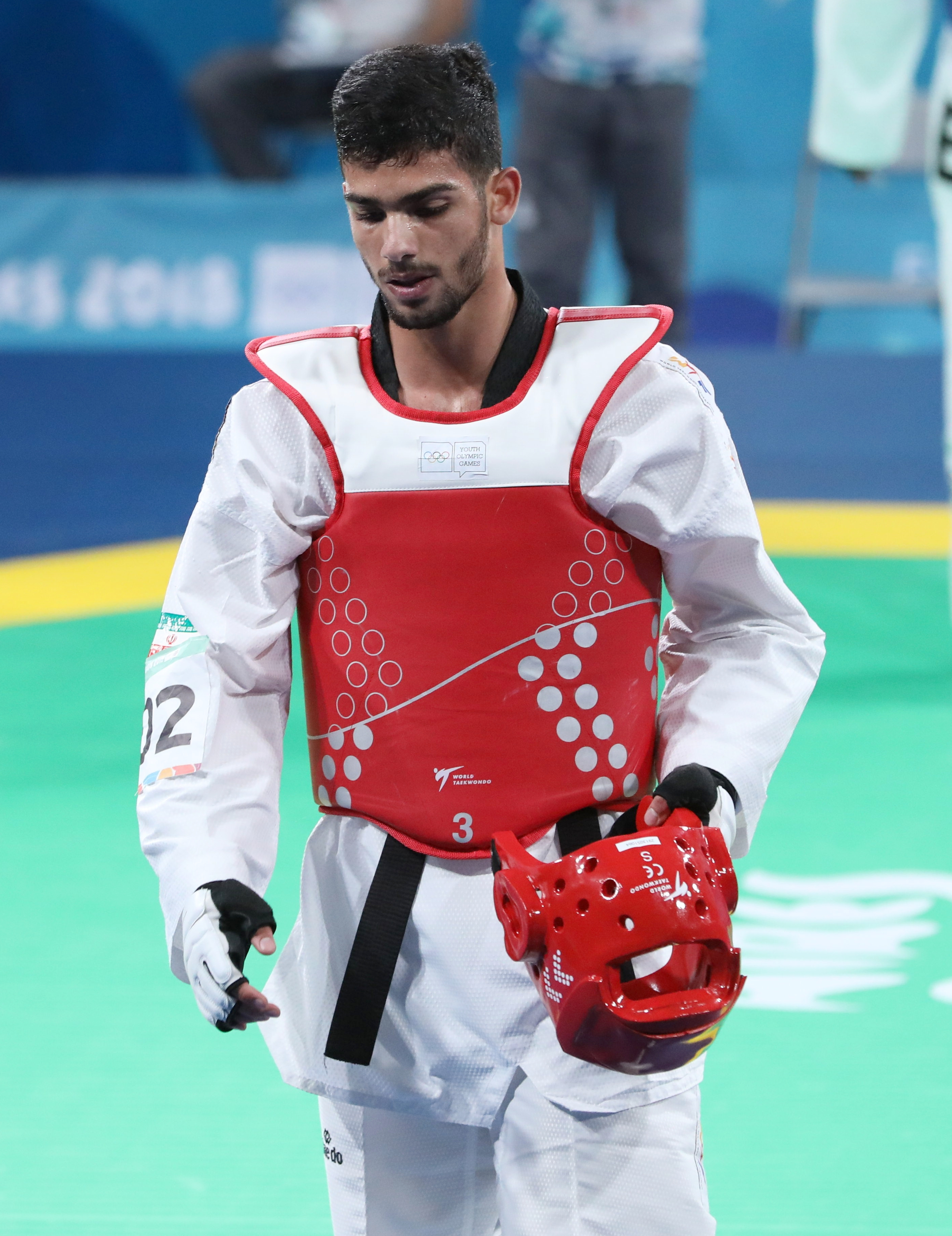
Ali Eshkevarian (Youth Olympic Champion)

Round of 16
9 | Charly Kapashika Lutumba (COD) | 4
8 | Anargyros Sofotasios (GRE) | 26
7 | Qiu Hong-sheng (TPE) | 15
10 | David Robleto (NCA) | 8

Quarterfinals
1 | Eyad Barakat (EGY) | 29
8 | Anargyros Sofotasios (GRE) | 5
5 | Badr Achab (BEL) | 23
4 | Andranik Khachatryan (ARM) | 15
3 | Dušan Božanić (SRB) | 20
6 | Darlyn Padilla (ECU) | 23
7 | Qiu Hong-sheng (TPE) | 17
2 | Ali Eshkevarian (IRI) | 19

Semifinals
1 | Eyad Barakat (EGY) | 4
5 | Badr Achab (BEL) | 8
6 | Darlyn Padilla (ECU) | 5
2 | Ali Eshkevarian (IRI) | 29

Gold medal match
5 | Badr Achab (BEL) | 16
2 | Ali Eshkevarian (IRI) | 17
