= Wrestling at the 2010 Summer Youth Olympics – Boys' Greco-Roman 69 kg =

The boys' 69 kg Greco-Roman tournament in wrestling at the 2010 Summer Youth Olympics was held on August 15 at the International Convention Centre.

The event limited competitors to a maximum of 69 kilograms of body mass. The tournament had two groups where wrestlers compete in a round-robin format. The winners of each group would go on to play for the gold medal, second placers played for the bronze medal while everyone else played for classification depending on where they ranked in the group stage.

== Medalists ==
Gold	Silver	Bronze
Zhanibek Kandybayev; Kazakhstan	Musa Gedik; Turkey	Yousef Ghaderian; Iran

== Group stages ==
=== Group A ===
Athlete	Pld	C. Points	T. Points
Musa Gedik (TUR)	3	10	16
Yousef Ghaderian (IRI)	3	6	15
Abdelkrim Ouakali (ALG)	3	6	19
Ahmad Darwish (SYR)	3	1	1

Yousef Ghaderian (IRI)	2-1 (2–0, 0-5, 2–0)	Abdelkrim Ouakali (ALG)
Musa Gedik (TUR)	2-1 (7–0, 0-1, 2–0)	Ahmad Darwish (SYR)
Yousef Ghaderian (IRI)	Fall (3–0, 0-3)	Musa Gedik (TUR)
Abdelkrim Ouakali (ALG)	Fall (5–0)	Ahmad Darwish (SYR)
Yousef Ghaderian (IRI)	2-0 (2–0, 6–0)	Ahmad Darwish (SYR)
Abdelkrim Ouakali (ALG)	1-2 (1-2, 5–0, 0-2)	Musa Gedik (TUR)

=== Group B ===
Athlete	Pld	C. Points	T. Points
Zhanibek Kandybayev (KAZ)	3	10	27
Aliaksandr Nedashkouski (BLR)	3	8	19
Carlos Valor (COL)	3	5	14
Jose Gonzalez (NCA)	3	0	0

Aliaksandr Nedashkouski (BLR)	2-0 (6–0, 3–0)	Jose Gonzalez (NCA)
Zhanibek Kandybayev (KAZ)	2-0 (7–0, 3–0)	Carlos Valor (COL)
Aliaksandr Nedashkouski (BLR)	0-2 (0-1, 2-3)	Zhanibek Kandybayev (KAZ)
Jose Gonzalez (NCA)	Fall (0-5, 0-6)	Carlos Valor (COL)
Aliaksadr Nedashkouski (BLR)	2-0 (5–0, 3–0)	Carlos Valor (COL)
Jose Gonzalez (NCA)	T. Fall (0-6, 0-7)	Zhanibek Kandybayev (KAZ)

== Classification ==
=== 7th-place match ===
Ahmad Darwish (SYR)	2-0 (5–1, 3–0)	Jose Gonzalez (NCA)

=== 5th-place match ===
Abdelkrim Ouakali (ALG)	2-0 (2–1, 2–1)	Carlos Valor (COL)

=== Bronze-medal match ===
Yousef Ghaderian (IRI)	2-1 (2-4, 4–0, 4–0)	Aliaksandr Nedashkouski (BLR)

=== Gold-medal match ===
Musa Gedik (TUR)	0-2 (0-1, 1-2)	Zhanibek Kandybayev (KAZ)

== Final rankings ==
Rank	Athlete
Gold medal	Zhanibek Kandybayev (KAZ)
Silver medal	Musa Gedik (TUR)
Bronze medal	Yousef Ghaderian (IRI)
4	Aliaksandr Nedashkouski (BLR)
5	Abdelkrim Ouakali (ALG)
6	Carlos Valor (COL)
7	Ahmad Darwish (SYR)
8	Jose Gonzalez (NCA)
