= Weightlifting at the 2010 Summer Youth Olympics – Girls' 53 kg =

The girls' 53 kg weightlifting event was the second women's event at the weightlifting competition at the 2010 Summer Youth Olympics, with competitors limited to a maximum of 53 kilograms of body mass. The whole competition took place on August 16 at 14:30.

Each lifter performed in both the snatch and clean and jerk lifts, with the final score being the sum of the lifter's best result in each. The athlete received three attempts in each of the two lifts; the score for the lift was the heaviest weight successfully lifted.

== Medalists ==
Gold	Boyanka Kostova; Bulgaria	192 kg
Silver	Hsing-Chun Kuo; Chinese Taipei	174 kg
Bronze	Dewi Safitri; Indonesia	171 kg

== Results ==
Rank	Name	Group	Body Weight	Snatch (kg)				Clean & Jerk (kg)				Total (kg)
Rank	Name	Group	Body Weight	1	2	3	Res	1	2	3	Res	Total (kg)
1st place, gold medalist(s)	Boyanka Kostova (BUL)	A	52.73	78	82	85	85	~~98~~	98	107	107	192
2nd place, silver medalist(s)	Hsing-Chun Kuo (TPE)	A	52.91	72	75	77	77	90	95	97	97	174
3rd place, bronze medalist(s)	Dewi Safitri (INA)	A	51.32	~~70~~	71	~~76~~	71	95	100	~~103~~	100	171
4	Yineisy Reyes (DOM)	A	52.26	~~80~~	80	~~85~~	80	80	~~86~~	86	86	166
5	Diana Cadena (COL)	A	52.51	~~68~~	68	71	71	87	~~90~~	90	90	161
6	Damla Aydin (TUR)	A	52.25	67	~~70~~	~~72~~	67	~~80~~	80	~~85~~	80	147
7	Oumaima Majri (TUN)	A	52.46	58	62	~~65~~	62	73	78	~~80~~	78	140
8	Lomina Tibon (MHL)	A	52.26	25	~~30~~	30	30	35	~~45~~	~~45~~	35	65
