= Wrestling at the 2010 Summer Youth Olympics – Boys' freestyle 46 kg =

The boys' 46 kg tournament in wrestling at the 2010 Summer Youth Olympics was held on August 17 at the International Convention Centre.

The event limited competitors to a maximum of 46 kilograms of body mass. The tournament had two groups where wrestlers compete in a round-robin format. The winners of each group would go on to play for the gold medal, second placers played for the bronze medal while everyone else played for classification depending on where they ranked in the group stage.

== Medalists ==
Gold	Silver	Bronze
Aldar Balzhinimaev; Russia	Mehran Sheikhi; Iran	Artak Hovhannisyan; Armenia

== Group stages ==
=== Group A ===
Athlete	Pld	C. Points	T. Points
Mehran Sheikhi (IRI)	2	7	11
Andry Davila (VEN)	2	5	8
Robinson Rios (PER)	2	0	2

Andry Davila (VEN)	Fall (7–0)	Robinson Rios (PER)
Andry Davila (VEN)	0-2 (1-3, 0-1)	Mahran Sheikhi (IRI)
Robinson Rios (PER)	Fall (2-7)	Mehran Sheikh (IRI)

=== Group B ===
Athlete	Pld	C. Points	T. Points
Aldar Balzhinimaev (RUS)	2	6	13
Artak Hovhannisyan (ARM)	2	4	9
Mohamed Abdelnaeem (EGY)	2	1	1

Mohamed Abdelnaeem (EGY)	0-2 (0-6, 0-1)	Artak Hovhannisyan (ARM)
Mohamed Abdelnaeem (EGY)	0-2 (0-3, 1-2)	Aldar Balzhinimaev (RUS)
Artak Hovhannisyan (ARM)	0-2 (1-4, 1-4)	Aldar Balzhinimaev (RUS)

== Classification ==
=== 5th-place match ===
Robinson Rios (PER)	Fall (6-5)	Mohamed Abdelnaeem (EGY)

=== Bronze-medal match ===
Andry Davila (VEN)	0-2 (0-4, 1-5)	Artak Hovhannisyan (ARM)

=== Gold-medal match ===
Mehran Sheikhi (IRI)	Fall (2-4, 0-7)	Aldar Balzhinimaev (RUS)

== Final rankings ==
Rank	Athlete
Gold medal	Aldar Balzhinimaev (RUS)
Silver medal	Mehran Sheikhi (IRI)
Bronze medal	Artak Hovhannisyan (ARM)
4	Andry Davila (VEN)
5	Mohamed Abdelnaeem (EGY)
6	Robinson Rios (PER)
