= Marshall Islands at the 2010 Summer Youth Olympics =

- IOC code: MHL
- NOC: Comité National Olympique et Sportif du Mali

in Singapore
- Competitors: 4 in 2 sports
- Flag bearer: Amon Shiro
- Medals: Gold 0 Silver 0 Bronze 0 Total 0

Summer Youth Olympics appearances
- 2010; 2014; 2018

The Marshall Islands competed at the 2010 Summer Youth Olympics, the inaugural Youth Olympic Games, held in Singapore from 14 August to 26 August 2010.

== Swimming ==
Athletes	Event	Heat		Semifinal		Final	
Athletes	Event	Time	Position	Time	Position	Time	Position
Giordan Harris	Boys’ 50m Freestyle	28.43	41	Did not advance			
Hagar Kabua	Girls’ 50m Freestyle	33.82	57	Did not advance			

== Weightlifting ==
Athlete	Event	Snatch	Clean & Jerk	Total	Rank
Amon Shiro	Boys' 56kg	55	65	120	11
Lomina Tibon	Girls' 53kg	30	35	65	8
