= Afghanistan at the 2018 Summer Youth Olympics =

- IOC code: AFG
- NOC: Afghanistan National Olympic Committee

in Buenos Aires, Argentina 6 – 18 October 2018
- Competitors: 3 in 3 sports
- Medals Ranked 83rd: Gold 0 Silver 0 Bronze 1 Total 1

Summer Youth Olympics appearances
- 2010; 2014; 2018

Afghanistan participated at the 2018 Summer Youth Olympics in Buenos Aires, Argentina from 6 October to 18 October 2018.

== Medalists ==
Medal	Name	Sport	Event	Date
Bronze	Nisar Ahmad Abdul Rahimzai	Taekwondo	Boys' +73 kg	11 October

== Athletics ==
Athlete	Event	Stage 1	Stage 2	Final Placing
Nazi Yari	Women's 100m	17.43	DNS	N/A

== Boxing ==
Athlete	Event	Preliminary R1	Preliminary R2	Semifinals	Final / RM	Rank
Athlete	Event	Opposition Result	Opposition Result	Opposition Result	Opposition Result	Rank
Sultan Mohammad Naeemi	-52 kg	Sukthet (THA); L 0–5	de Oliveira (BRA); L WO	Did not advance	Maouche (ALG); L WO	6

== Taekwondo ==
Afghanistan qualified one competitor in the +73 kg event of the taekwondo.

Athlete	Event	Quarterfinals	Semifinals	Final	
Athlete	Event	Opposition Result	Opposition Result	Opposition Result	Rank
Nisar Ahmad Abdul Rahimzai	Boys' +73 kg	Khalaf (EGY); W 29–25	Khosravi (IRI); L 16–19	Did not advance	3rd place, bronze medalist(s)
