= Ahmad Darwish =

Syrian footballer

Personal information
- Place of birth: Syria
- Position: Midfielder

International career
Years	Team	Apps	(Gls)
- Syria

Ahmad Darwish was a Syrian professional footballer. He played for Syria in the editions 1980 Asian Cup and 1984 Asian Cup.
