= Mehran Sheikhi =

Iranian wrestler

Medal record

Representing Iran

Men's freestyle wrestling

Youth Olympic Games
Silver medal – second place	2010 Singapore	46 kg

Mehran Sheikhi (Persian: مهران شيخى) is an Iranian wrestler who participated at the 2010 Summer Youth Olympics in Singapore. He won the silver medal in the boys' freestyle 46 kg event, losing to Aldar Balzhinimaev of Russia in the final.
