= Aldar Balzhinimaev =

Russian wrestler (born 1993)

Personal information
- Native name: Алдар Леонидович Бальжинимаев
- Full name: Aldar Leonidovich Balzhinimaev
- Nationality: Russia
- Born: August 9, 1993 (age 32) Kizhinga, Buryatia, Russia
- Height: 160 cm (5 ft 3 in)

Sport
- Country: Russia
- Sport: Wrestling
- Weight class: 57-61 kg
- Event: Freestyle

Achievements and titles
- National finals: 5th (2016) 5th (2022)
Medal record
Men's freestyle wrestling
Representing Buryatia
Russian National Championships
Bronze medal – third place	2021 Ulan-Ude	61 kg
Representing Russia
European Juniors Championships
Gold medal – first place	2012 Zagreb	50 kg
Gold medal – first place	2011 Zrenjanin	50 kg
Youth Olympic Games
Gold medal – first place	2010 Singapore	46 kg
European Cadets Championships
Bronze medal – third place	2010 Sarajevo	46 kg

Aldar Balzhinimaev (born August 9, 1993) is a Russian wrestler who participated at the 2010 Summer Youth Olympics in Singapore. He won the gold medal in the boys' freestyle 46 kg event, defeating Mehran Sheikhi of Iran in the final.

Balzhinimaev was born in Kizhinga, Buryatia.
