= Hamdy Abdelwahab =

Egyptian wrestler and mixed martial artist (born 1993)

- Born: Hamdy El-Said Abdelwahab; 22 January 1993 (age 33); Cairo, Egypt
- Other names: The Hammer
- Height: 6 ft 2 in (188 cm)
- Weight: 265 lb (120 kg; 18 st 13 lb)
- Division: Heavyweight
- Reach: 73 in (185 cm)
- Style: Wrestling
- Fighting out of: New York City, New York
- Team: Killer B Combat Sports Academy
- Wrestling: Olympian Greco-Roman wrestling
- Years active: 2019–present (MMA)

Mixed martial arts record
- Total: 11
- Wins: 7
- By knockout: 5
- By decision: 2
- Losses: 3
- By decision: 3
- No contests: 1

Other information
- Notable club: Killer B Combat Sports Academy
- Mixed martial arts record from Sherdog

Hamdy El-Said Abdelwahab (Arabic: حمدي عبدالوهاب; born 22 January 1993) is an Egyptian Greco-Roman wrestler and mixed martial artist. He competed in the heavyweight division of the Ultimate Fighting Championship. He competed in the men's Greco-Roman 98 kg event at the 2016 Summer Olympics, in which he was eliminated in the round of 16 by Alin Alexuc-Ciurariu.

== Mixed martial arts career ==
=== Gamebred Fighting Championship ===
Abdelwahab made his mixed martial arts debut for Jorge Masvidal's bare-knuckle MMA promotion Gamebred Fighting Championship, defeating Matthew Strickland via first-round TKO at Gamebred FC 2 on 1 October 2021.

He made his sophomore appearance on Gamebred FC by defeating Connor McKenna by first-round technical knockout at Gamebred FC 3.

=== iKon Fighting Championship ===
Abdelwahab next appeared on iKon FC, where he defeated Dustin Clements by third-round technical knockout on 21 January 2022.

He then defeated Matthew Strickland via first-round knockout at iKon FC 3 on 3 June 2022.

=== Ultimate Fighting Championship ===
On 28 June 2022, it was announced that Abdelwahab had signed with the UFC, making him the first Egyptian fighter to sign with the organization.

Abdelwahab made his promotional debut at UFC 277 against Don'Tale Mayes. He won the fight via a split decision. However, the fight would be overturned to no-contest due to failing a drug test.

Abdelwahab was scheduled to face Parker Porter on 22 October 2022, at UFC 280. However, Abdelwahab was removed from the event for unknown reasons and he was replaced by Slim Trabelsi.

In early February 2023, Abdelwahab had accepted a two–year suspension from USADA after he tested positive for the banned anabolic agent Metenolone during two drug tests in late summer 2022. He was able to compete again on 30 July 2024. However, at the end of July 2024, the UFC's anti-doping program CSAD suspended Abdelwahab for six months for "exogenous testosterone" which will allow him to compete on 30 January 2025.

Abdelwahab faced Jamal Pogues on 1 February 2025 at UFC Fight Night 250. He won the fight by split decision.

Abdelwahab was scheduled to face Mohammed Usman on 17 May 2025 at UFC Fight Night 256. However, after the event was no longer held in Qatar, the bout was moved to 21 June 2025 and took place at UFC on ABC 8. He lost the fight by unanimous decision.

Abdelwahab faced Chris Barnett on 25 October 2025 at UFC 321. Despite being deducted one point due to illegal elbow to the back of head, Abdelwahab won the fight by unanimous decision.

On 27 October 2025, it was reported that Abdelwahab had been removed from the UFC roster, despite winning his most recent bout.

== Championships and accomplishments ==
=== Greco-Roman wrestling ===
- Summer Youth Olympic Games
  - (silver) 2010 Youth Olympic Games –85 kg runner-up
- Africa & Oceania Olympic Qualifiers
  - (gold) 2016 Africa & Oceania Olympic Qualification –98 kg Greco-Roman Champion
- Summer Olympic Games
  - 2016 Olympic Games –98 kg 10th place

== Mixed martial arts record ==
Professional record breakdown
| 11 matches | 7 wins | 3 losses |
| By knockout | 5 | 0 |
| By decision | 2 | 3 |
| No contests | 1 | |

| Res. | Record | Opponent | Method | Event | Date | Round | Time | Location | Notes |
|---|---|---|---|---|---|---|---|---|---|
| Loss | 7–3 (1) | Klidson Abreu | Decision (unanimous) | ACA 209 | October 31, 2026 | 3 | 5:00 | Dushanbe, Tajikistan | Abdelwahab was deducted one point in round 3 due to knee to groin. |
| Loss | 7–2 (1) | Anton Vinnikov | Decision (unanimous) | ACA 202 | April 12, 2026 | 3 | 5:00 | Saint Petersburg, Russia | |
| Win | 7–1 (1) | Chris Barnett | Decision (unanimous) | UFC 321 | 25 October 2025 | 3 | 5:00 | Abu Dhabi, United Arab Emirates | Abdelwahab was deducted one point in round 1 due to an illegal elbow to the back of the head. |
| Loss | 6–1 (1) | Mohammed Usman | Decision (unanimous) | UFC on ABC: Hill vs. Rountree Jr. | 21 June 2025 | 3 | 5:00 | Baku, Azerbaijan | |
| Win | 6–0 (1) | Jamal Pogues | Decision (split) | UFC Fight Night: Adesanya vs. Imavov | 1 February 2025 | 3 | 5:00 | Riyadh, Saudi Arabia | |
| NC | 5–0 (1) | Don'Tale Mayes | NC (overturned) | UFC 277 | 30 July 2022 | 3 | 5:00 | Dallas, Texas, United States | Originally a split decision win for Abdelwahab; overturned after he tested positive for methenolone. |
| Win | 5–0 | Matthew Strickland | KO (punch) | Jorge Masvidal's iKon FC 3 | 3 June 2022 | 1 | 0:27 | Richmond, Virginia, United States | |
| Win | 4–0 | Tyler Lee | TKO (punches) | Gamebred FC: Freedom Fight Night | 19 March 2022 | 1 | 0:26 | Miami, Florida, United States | |
| Win | 3–0 | Dustin Clements | TKO (leg injury) | Jorge Masvidal's iKon FC 1 | 21 January 2022 | 3 | 3:25 | West Palm Beach, Florida, United States | |
| Win | 2–0 | Connor McKenna | TKO (punches) | Gamebred Bareknuckle MMA 3 | 17 December 2021 | 1 | 0:33 | Biloxi, Mississippi, United States | |
| Win | 1–0 | Matthew Strickland | TKO (punches) | Gamebred Bareknuckle MMA 2 | 1 October 2021 | 1 | 0:15 | Biloxi, Mississippi, United States | Heavyweight debut. |
