= Kim Song-chol (weightlifter) =

North Korean weightlifter (born 1993)

Personal information
- Born: 30 November 1993 (age 32)
- Weight: 61.83 kg (136.3 lb)

Sport
- Country: North Korea
- Sport: Weightlifting
- Weight class: 62 kg

Korean name
- Hangul: 김성철
- RR: Gim Seongcheol
- MR: Kim Sŏngch'ŏl
- Updated on 9 November 2016

Kim Song-chol (Korean: 김성철; born 30 November 1993) is a North Korean male weightlifter, who competed in the 62 kg category and represented North Korea at international competitions.

He won the gold medal at the 2010 Summer Youth Olympics.

== Major results ==
Year	Venue	Weight	Snatch (kg)				Clean & Jerk (kg)				Total	Rank
Year	Venue	Weight	1	2	3	Rank	1	2	3	Rank	Total	Rank
Summer Youth Olympics
2010	Singapore	62 kg	113	117	~~121~~	---	137	140	~~145~~	---	257	1st place, gold medalist(s)
