= Alireza Kazeminejad =

Iranian weightlifter

Personal information
- Nationality: Iranian
- Born: 7 February 1994 (age 32)
- Weight: 168 kg (370 lb)

Sport
- Country: Iran
- Sport: Weightlifting
- Event: +105 kg

Achievements and titles
- Personal bests: Snatch: 169 kg (2011); Clean and jerk: 217 kg (2011); Total: 386 kg (2011)
Medal record
Men's weightlifting
Representing Iran
Youth Olympic Games
Gold medal – first place	2010 Singapore	+94 kg
Junior World Championships
Silver medal – second place	2011 Penang	+105 kg
Youth World Championships
Silver medal – second place	2011 Lima	+94 kg

Alireza Kazeminejad (Persian: علیرضا کاظمی‌نژاد; born 7 February 1994) is an Iranian weightlifter who won a gold medal at the 2010 Youth Olympic Games in Singapore.

== Major results ==
Year	Venue	Weight	Snatch (kg)				Clean & Jerk (kg)				Total	Rank
Year	Venue	Weight	1	2	3	Rank	1	2	3	Rank	Total	Rank
World Junior Championships
2011	Penang, Malaysia	+105 kg	163	169	~~172~~	4	200	212	217	2nd place, silver medalist(s)	386	2nd place, silver medalist(s)
Youth Olympic Games
2010	Singapore, Singapore	+94 kg	148	155	~~160~~	2	190	196	--	1	351	1st place, gold medalist(s)
World Youth Championships
2011	Lima, Peru	+94 kg	154	161	166	2nd place, silver medalist(s)	201	~~214~~	~~214~~	2nd place, silver medalist(s)	367	2nd place, silver medalist(s)
