= Wrestling at the 2018 Summer Youth Olympics – Boys' Greco-Roman 60 kg =

Boys' Greco-Roman 60kg at the III Summer Youth Olympic Games
- Venue: Asia Pavilion
- Date: 12 October
- Competitors: 6 from 6 nations

Medalists
| 1st place, gold medalist(s) | | Giorgi Chkhikvadze | Georgia |
| 2nd place, silver medalist(s) | | Elmirbek Sadyrov | Kyrgyzstan |
| 3rd place, bronze medalist(s) | | Sahak Hovhannisyan | Armenia |

The Boys' Greco-Roman 60 kg competition at the 2018 Summer Youth Olympics was held on 12 October, at the Asia Pavilion.

== Competition format ==
As there were less than six wrestlers in a weight category, the pool phase will be run as a single group competing in a round robin format. Ranking within the groups is used to determine the pairings for the final phase.

== Schedule ==
All times are in local time (UTC-3).

| Date | Time | Round |
|---|---|---|
| Friday, 12 October 2018 | 10:10; 10:35; 11:00; 17:40 | Round 1 Round 2 Round 3 Finals |

== Results ==
Legend

- F — Won by fall

Group Stages

| Qualified for the Gold Medal Match |
| Qualified for the Bronze Medal Match |
| Qualified for the 5th/6th Place Match |

Group A

| Pos | Athlete | Pld | W | L | CP | TP | Qualification |
|---|---|---|---|---|---|---|---|
| 1 | Elmirbek Sadyrov (KGZ) | 2 | 2 | 0 | 7 | 18 | Gold-medal match |
| 2 | Miguel Ugalde (MEX) | 2 | 1 | 1 | 5 | 14 | Bronze-medal match |
| 3 | Arapo Kellner (NZL) | 2 | 0 | 2 | 0 | 0 | Classification 5th/6th place match |

Source: UWW

| | Score | | CP |
|---|---|---|---|
| Arapo Kellner (NZL) | 0–9 | Elmirbek Sadyrov (KGZ) | 0–4 VSU |
| Miguel Ugalde (MEX) | 8–0 | Arapo Kellner (NZL) | 4–0 VSU |
| Elmirbek Sadyrov (KGZ) | 9–6 | Miguel Ugalde (MEX) | 3–1 VPO1 |

Group B

| Pos | Athlete | Pld | W | L | CP | TP | Qualification |
|---|---|---|---|---|---|---|---|
| 1 | Giorgi Chkhikvadze (GEO) | 2 | 2 | 0 | 7 | 16 | Gold-medal match |
| 2 | Sahak Hovhannisyan (ARM) | 2 | 1 | 1 | 5 | 11 | Bronze-medal match |
| 3 | Ahmed Merikhi (ALG) | 2 | 0 | 2 | 1 | 3 | Classification 5th/6th place match |

Source: UWW

| | Score | | CP |
|---|---|---|---|
| Sahak Hovhannisyan (ARM) | 10–0 | Ahmed Merikhi (ALG) | 4–0 VSU |
| Giorgi Chkhikvadze (GEO) | 3–1 | Sahak Hovhannisyan (ARM) | 3–1 VPO1 |
| Ahmed Merikhi (ALG) | 3–13 | Giorgi Chkhikvadze (GEO) | 1–4 VSU1 |

=== Finals ===
| Gold medal match |
| Elmirbek Sadyrov (KGZ) | 0 |
| Giorgi Chkhikvadze (GEO) | 9 |

| Bronze medal match |
| Miguel Ugalde (MEX) | 0 |
| Sahak Hovhannisyan (ARM) | 9 |

| Classification 5th/6th place match |
| Arapo Kellner (NZL) | 2 |
| Ahmed Merikhi (ALG) | 10 |

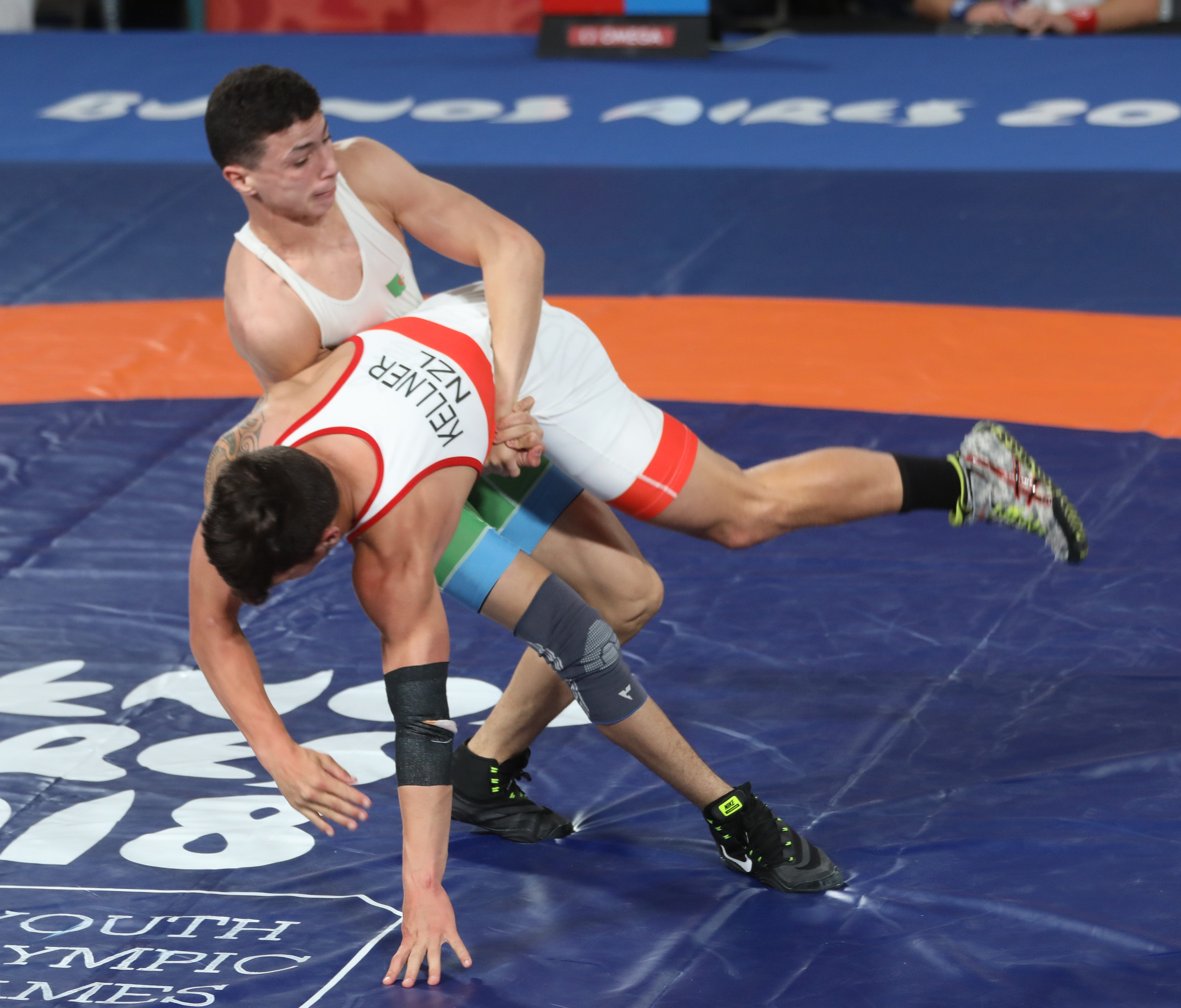
Classification 5th/6th Place Match: Arapo Kellner (in front) vs. Ahmed Merikhi

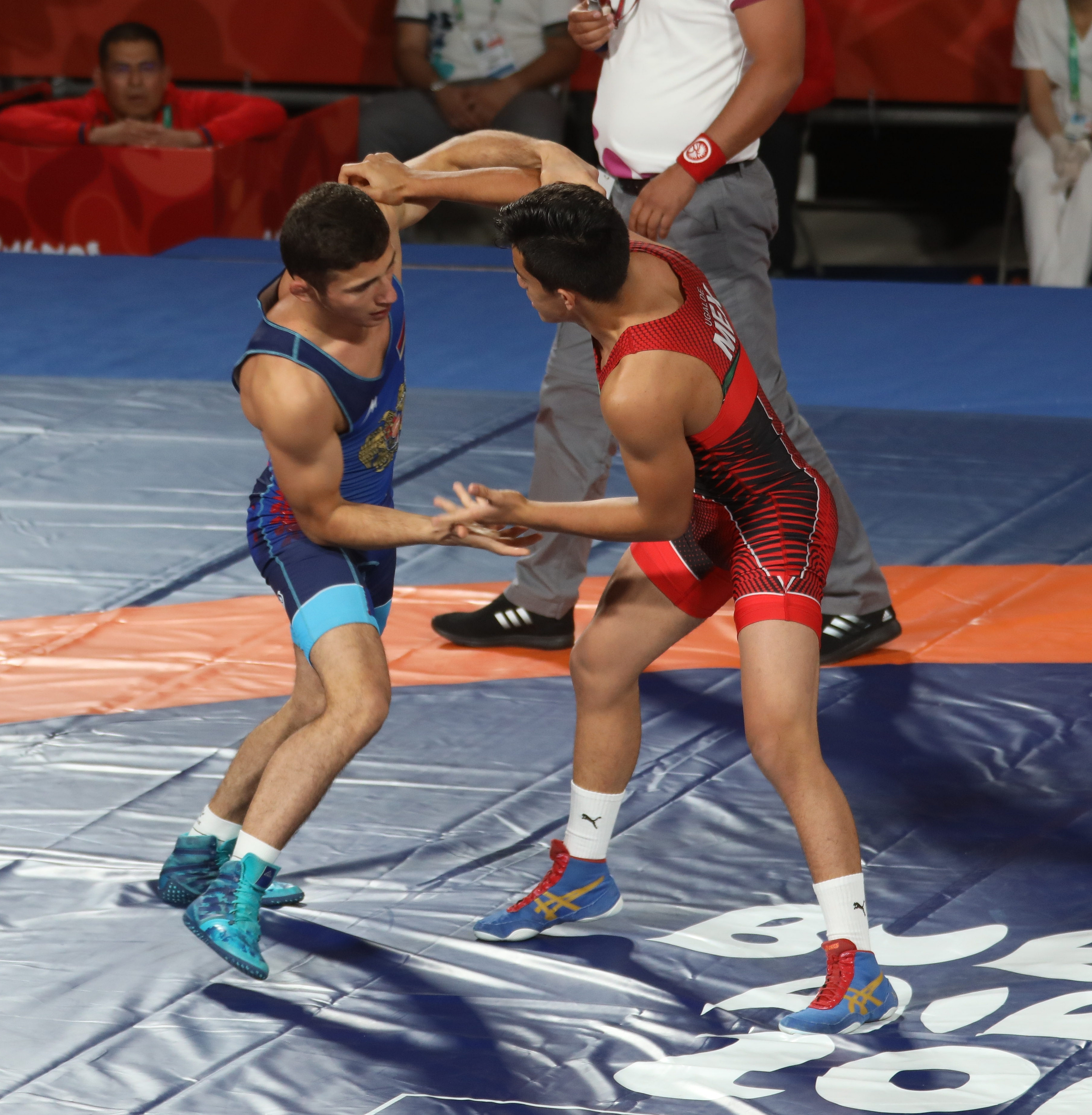
Bronze Medal Match: Miguel Ugalde (right) vs. Sahak Hovhannisyan

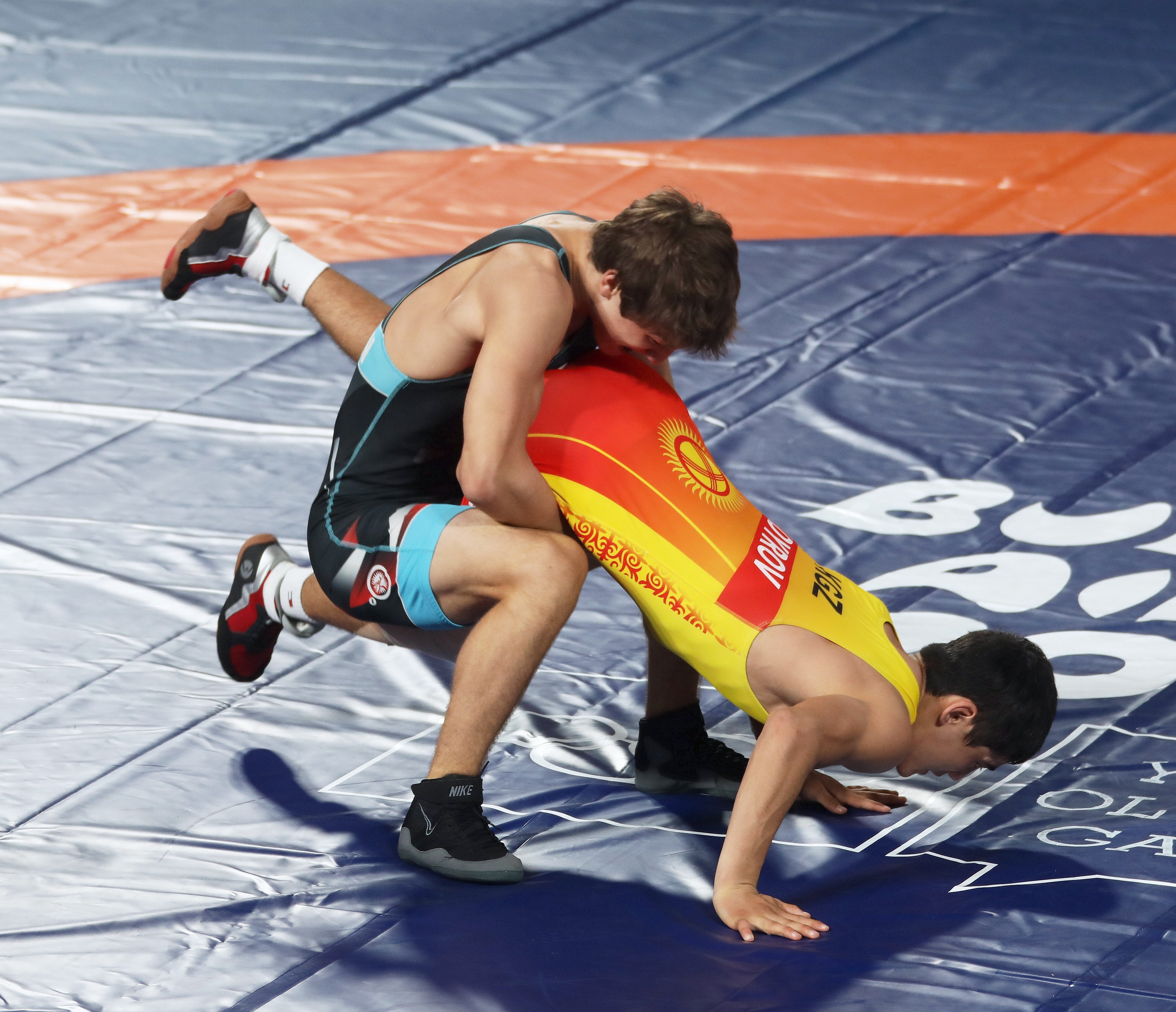
Gold Medal Match: Elmirbek Sadyrov (right) vs. Giorgi Chkhikvadze

== Final rankings ==
| Rank | Athlete |
|---|---|
| 1st place, gold medalist(s) | Giorgi Chkhikvadze (GEO) |
| 2nd place, silver medalist(s) | Elmirbek Sadyrov (KGZ)} |
| 3rd place, bronze medalist(s) | Sahak Hovhannisyan (ARM) |
| 4 | Miguel Ugalde (MEX) |
| 5 | Ahmed Merikhi (ALG) |
| 6 | Arapo Kellner (NZL) |

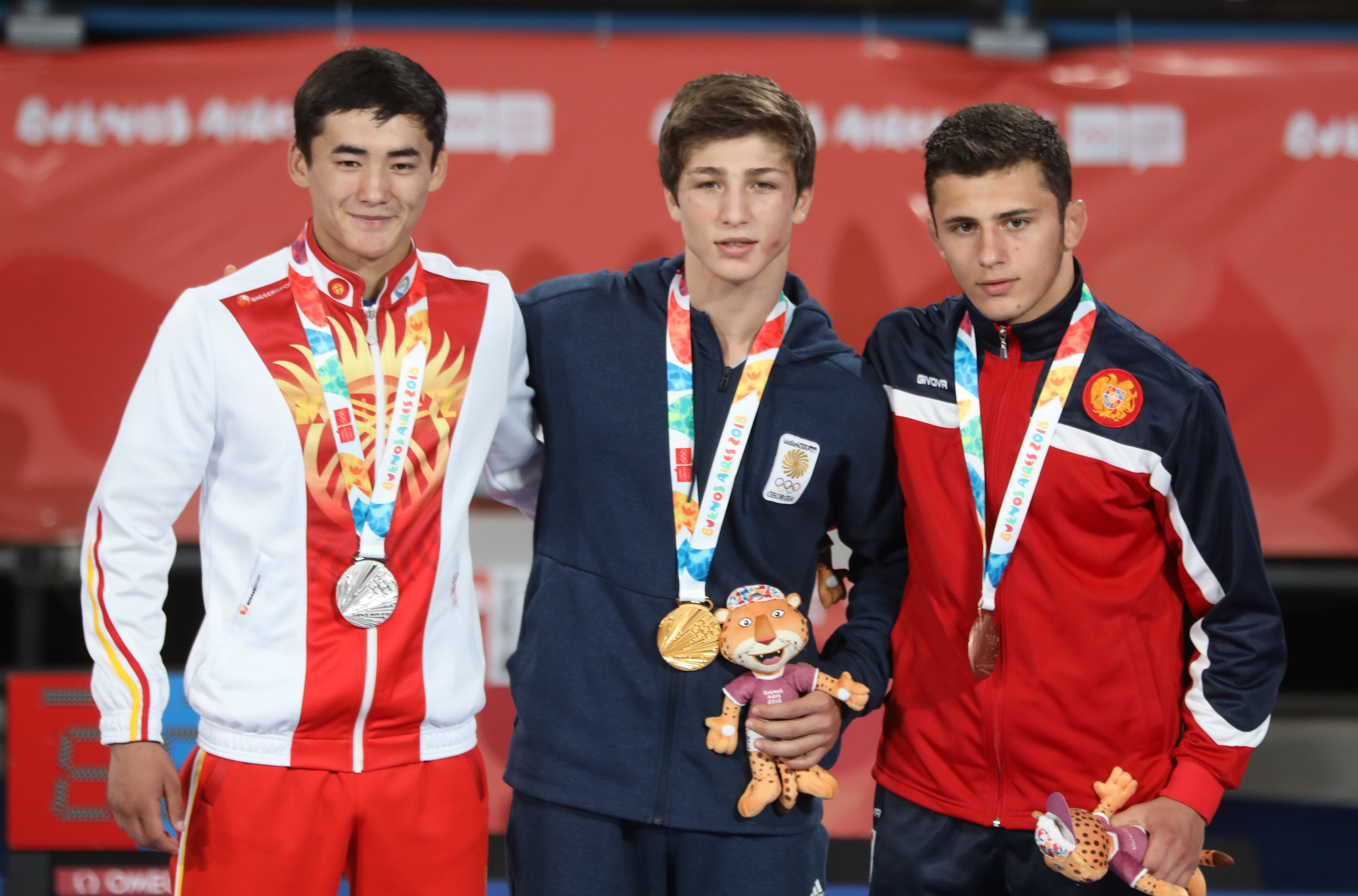
Victory ceremony (from left to right): Elmirbek Sadyrov (Silver), Giorgi Chkhikvadze (Gold), Sahak Hovhannisyan (Bronze)
