= Armenia at the 2018 Summer Youth Olympics =

- IOC code: ARM
- NOC: Armenian Olympic Committee
- Website: http://www.armnoc.am/

in Buenos Aires, Argentina 6 – 18 October 2018
- Competitors: 9 in 7 sports
- Flag bearer: Artur Barseghyan
- Medals Ranked 57th: Gold 1 Silver 0 Bronze 1 Total 2

Summer Youth Olympics appearances (overview)
- 2010; 2014; 2018

Armenia participated at the 2018 Summer Youth Olympics in Buenos Aires, Argentina from 6 October to 18 October 2018.

== Medalists ==
Medals awarded to participants of mixed-NOC teams are represented in italics. These medals are not counted towards the individual NOC medal tally.

Medal	Name	Sport	Event	Date
Gold	Karen Margaryan	Weightlifting	−77 kg	11 October
Bronze	Sahak Hovhannisyan	Wrestling	Boys' Greco-Roman −60kg	12 October

Medals by sport
Sport	1st place, gold medalist(s)	2nd place, silver medalist(s)	3rd place, bronze medalist(s)	Total
Weightlifting	1	0	0	1
Wrestling	0	0	1	1
Total	1	0	1	2

== Gymnastics ==
=== Rhythmic gymnastics ===
Armenia qualified one rhythmic gymnast based on its performance at the European qualification event.

- Girls' rhythmic individual all-around - 1 quota

== Judo ==
Individual

Athlete	Event	Round of 16	Quarterfinals	Semifinals	Rep 1	Rep 2	Rep 3	Final / BM	
Athlete	Event	Opposition Result	Opposition Result	Opposition Result	Opposition Result	Opposition Result	Opposition Result	Opposition Result	Rank
Yuri Israelyan	Boys' 55 kg	Juan Montealegre (COL); L 00-01s1	Did not advance		Bye	Bryan Garboa (ECU); L 00s3-10s2	Did not advance		

Team

Team	Event	Round 1	Round 2	Semifinals	Final	Rank
Team	Event	Opposition Result	Opposition Result	Opposition Result	Opposition Result	Rank
Seoul; Mohammed Al-Mishri (LBA); Alex Barto (SVK); Sairy Colón (PUR); María Giménez (VEN); Yuri Israelyan (ARM); Kim Ju-hee (KOR); Omaria Ramírez (DOM); Wu Xiao-zhang (TPE)	Mixed Team	Los Angeles; L 3–5	Did not advance			9

== Shooting ==
Armenia qualified one sport shooter based on its performance at the 2018 European Championships.

- Boys' 10m Air Rifle - 1 quota

Athlete	Event	Qualification		Final	
Athlete	Event	Points	Rank	Points	Rank
Hayk Babayan	Boys' 10 metre air rifle	616.9	13	Did not advance	

Team

Athletes	Event	Qualification		Round of 16	Quarterfinals	Semifinals	Final / BM	Rank
Athletes	Event	Points	Rank	Opposition Result	Opposition Result	Opposition Result	Opposition Result	Rank
Victoria Michelle Venning Rossiter (AUS); Hayk Babayan (ARM)	Mixed Team 10m Air Rifle	826.0	3	Janssen (GER); Mudiyanselage (SRI); W 10-9	Dereviagina (RUS); Ramírez Ramos (MEX); L 4-10	Did not advance		

== Swimming ==
Boys

Athletes	Event	Heat		Semifinal		Final	
Athletes	Event	Time	Position	Time	Position	Time	Position
Artur Barseghyan	50 m freestyle	23.17	14 Q	22.69	4 Q	23.13	8
Artur Barseghyan	100 m freestyle	51.33	17 QR	51.14	16	Did not advance	
Artur Barseghyan	50 m butterfly	24.42	10 Q	24.44	12	Did not advance	

== Taekwondo ==
Athlete	Event	Quarterfinals	Semifinals	Final	
Athlete	Event	Opposition Result	Opposition Result	Opposition Result	Rank
Andranik Khachatryan	Boys −73 kg	Badr Achab (BEL); L 15-23	Did not advance		

== Weightlifting ==
Armenia qualified one athlete based on its performance at the 2017 World Youth Championships.

Boy

Athlete	Event	Snatch		Clean & jerk		Total	Rank
Athlete	Event	Result	Rank	Result	Rank	Total	Rank
Karen Margaryan	−77 kg	141	1	168	2	309	1st place, gold medalist(s)

Girl

Athlete	Event	Snatch		Clean & jerk		Total	Rank
Athlete	Event	Result	Rank	Result	Rank	Total	Rank
Liana Gyurjyan	+63 kg	92	3	NM		DNF	

== Wrestling ==
Key:
- VSU – Without any point scored by the opponent
- VPO1 – With point(s) scored by the opponent

Athlete	Event	Group stage			Final / RM	Rank
Athlete	Event	Opposition Score	Opposition Score	Rank	Opposition Score	Rank
Sahak Hovhannisyan	Boys' Greco-Roman −60kg	Merikhi (ALG); W 10 – 0 ^{VSU}	Chkhikvadze (GEO); L 1 – 3 ^{VPO1}	2 Q	Ugalde (MEX); W 9 – 0 ^{VSU}	3rd place, bronze medalist(s)
