= Weightlifting at the 2018 Summer Youth Olympics – Boys' 77 kg =

Boys' 77 kg at the III Summer Youth Olympic Games
- Venue: Parque Polideportivo Roca
- Dates: 11 October
- Competitors: 9 from 9 nations

Medalists
| 1st place, gold medalist(s) | | Karen Margaryan; Armenia |
| 2nd place, silver medalist(s) | | Mukhammadkodir Toshtemirov; Uzbekistan |
| 3rd place, bronze medalist(s) | | Abdalla Galal Mohamed Mostafa; Egypt |

These are the results for the boys' 77 kg event at the 2018 Summer Youth Olympics.

== Results ==
| Rank | Name | Nation | Body Weight | Snatch (kg) | | | | Clean & Jerk (kg) | | | | Total (kg) |
| Rank | Name | Nation | Body Weight | 1 | 2 | 3 | Res | 1 | 2 | 3 | Res | Total (kg) |
|---|---|---|---|---|---|---|---|---|---|---|---|---|
| 1st place, gold medalist(s) | Karen Margaryan | Armenia | | 137 | 141 | ~~145~~ | 141 | 160 | 164 | 168 | 168 | 309 |
| 2nd place, silver medalist(s) | Mukhammadkodir Toshtemirov | Uzbekistan | | 134 | ~~138~~ | 140 | 140 | 156 | 162 | 168 | 168 | 308 |
| 3rd place, bronze medalist(s) | Abdalla Galal Mohamed Mostafa | Egypt | | 125 | ~~135~~ | ~~135~~ | 125 | 155 | 165 | 170 | 170 | 295 |
| 4 | Santiago Daniel Villegas Fernández | Peru | | 115 | ~~120~~ | 120 | 120 | 150 | 154 | ~~161~~ | 154 | 274 |
| 5 | Hermann Junior Ngaina II | Cameroon | | 105 | 120 | ~~125~~ | 120 | 143 | ~~152~~ | ~~155~~ | 143 | 263 |
| 6 | Jayden Dylon Pretorius | South Africa | | 95 | 105 | 112 | 112 | 126 | 133 | ~~142~~ | 133 | 245 |
| 7 | Žilvinas Žilinskas | Lithuania | | 105 | 109 | ~~113~~ | 109 | 125 | 130 | ~~137~~ | 130 | 239 |
| 8 | Shaikh Mohammed Al-Qasimi | United Arab Emirates | | ~~80~~ | 80 | 85 | 85 | 100 | ~~104~~ | 106 | 106 | 191 |
| 9 | Bleron Fetaovski | Kosovo | | 80 | 85 | 87 | 87 | 100 | 103 | ~~105~~ | 103 | 190 |

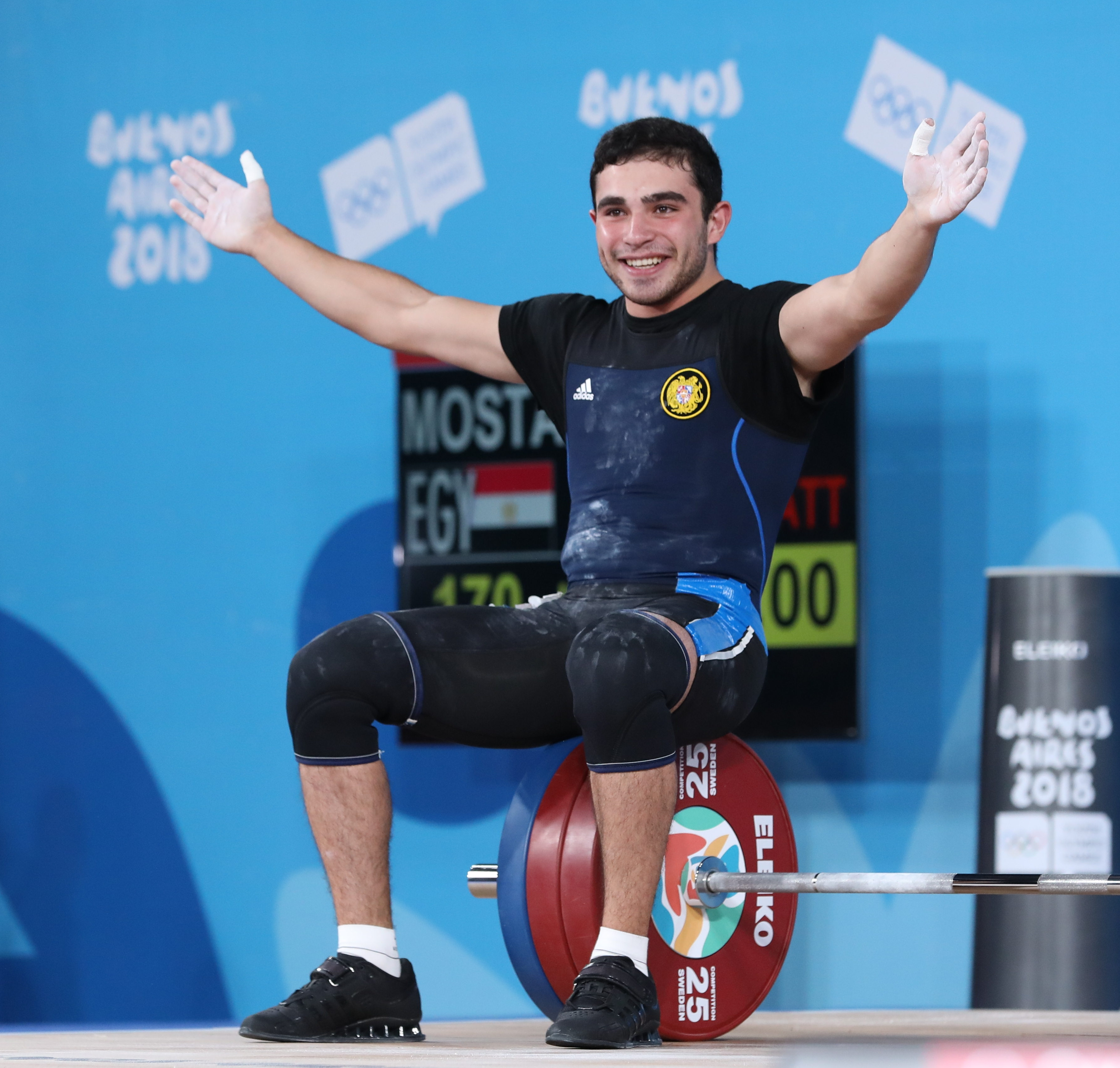
Karen Margaryan

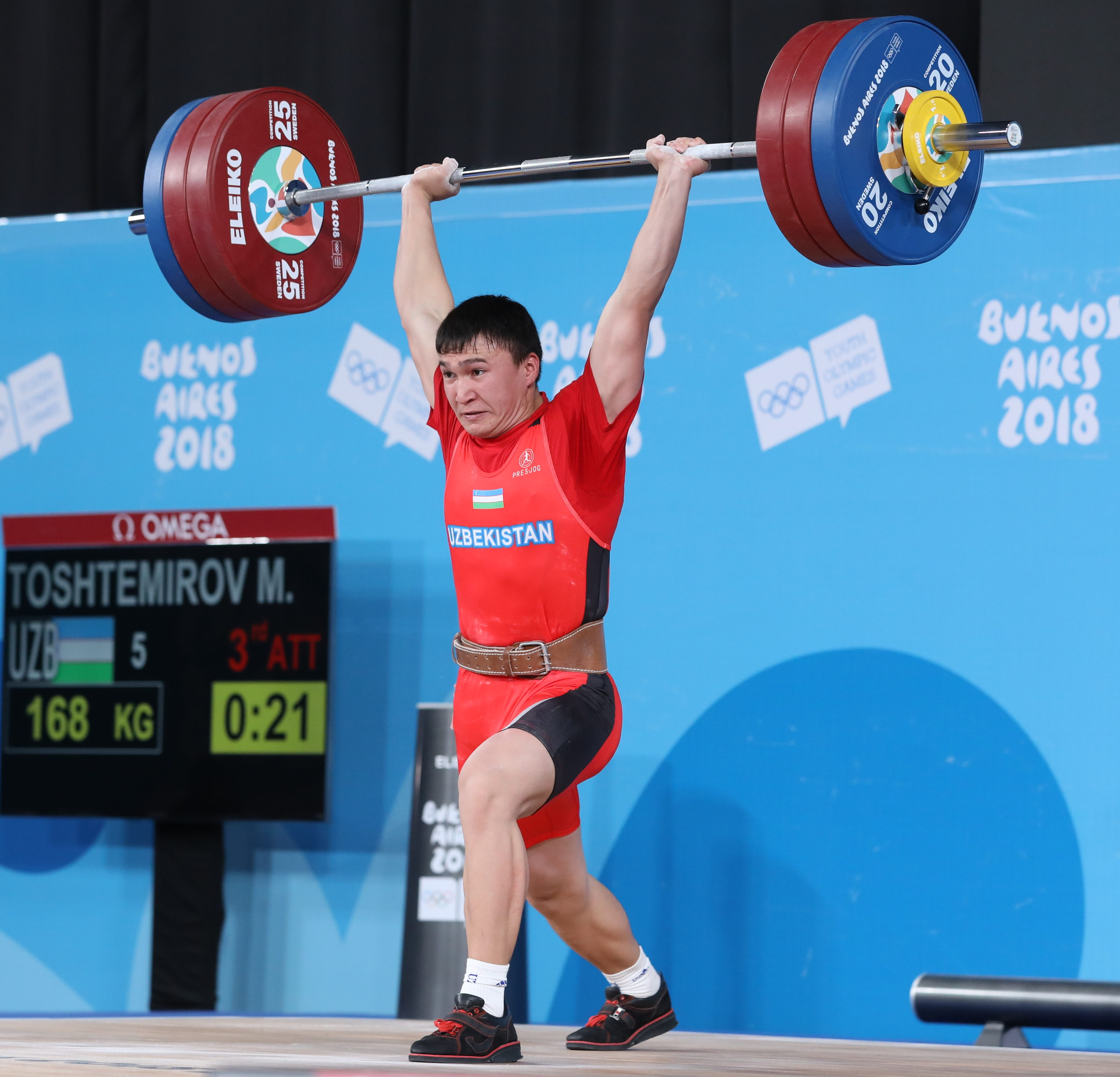
Mukhammadkodir Toshtemirov

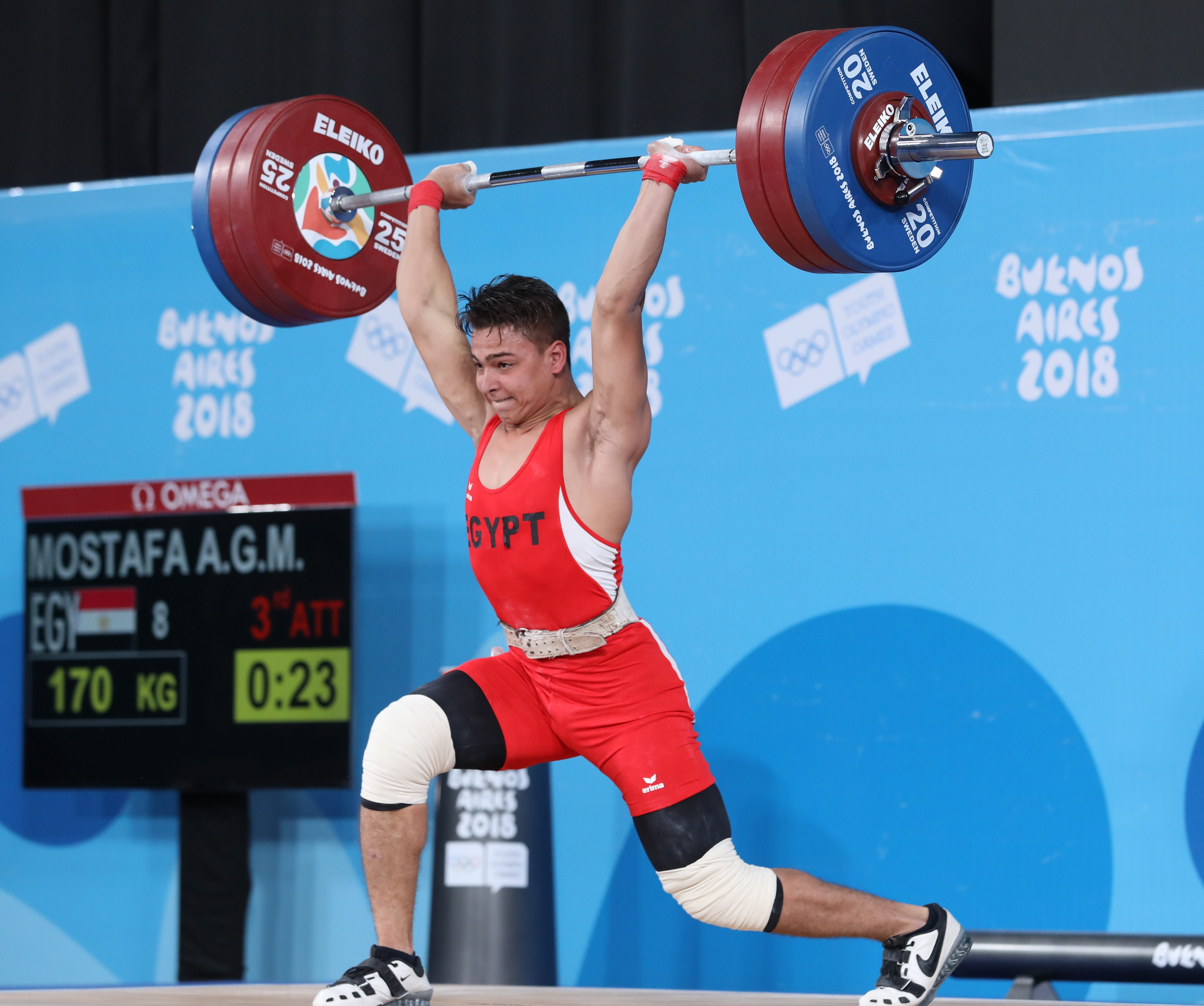
Abdalla Galal Mohamed Mostafa

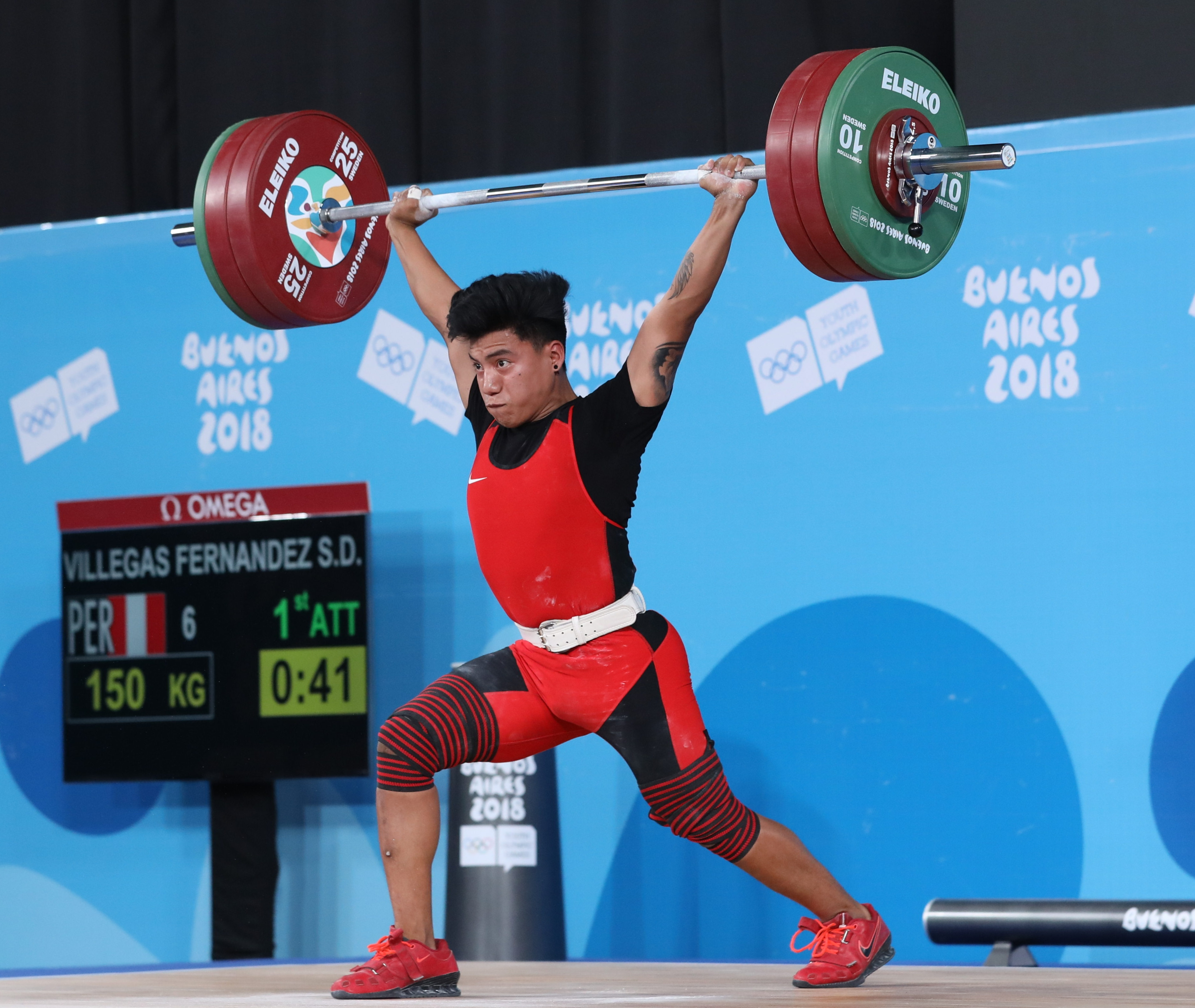
Santiago Daniel Villegas Fernández

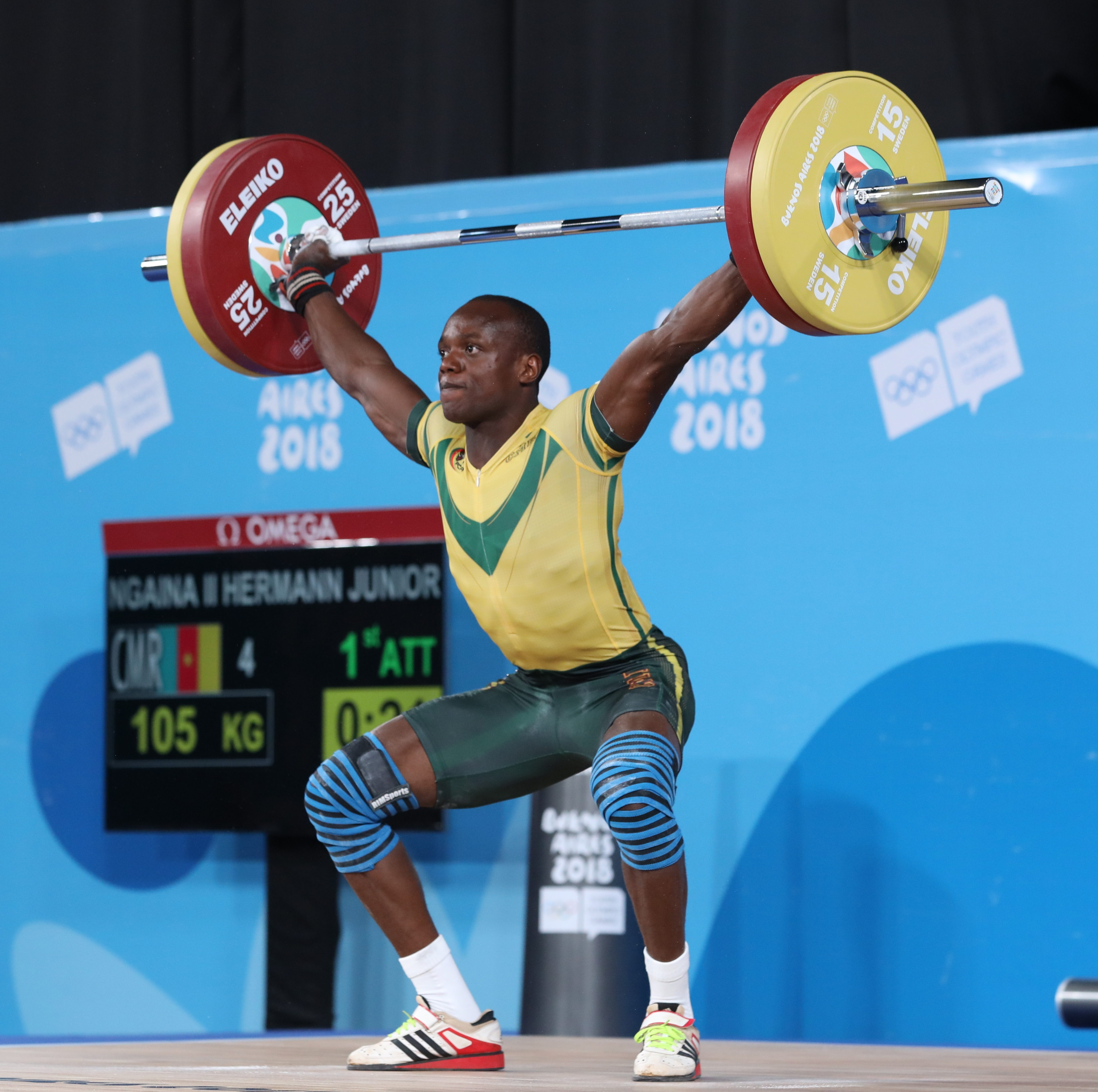
Hermann Junior Ngaina II

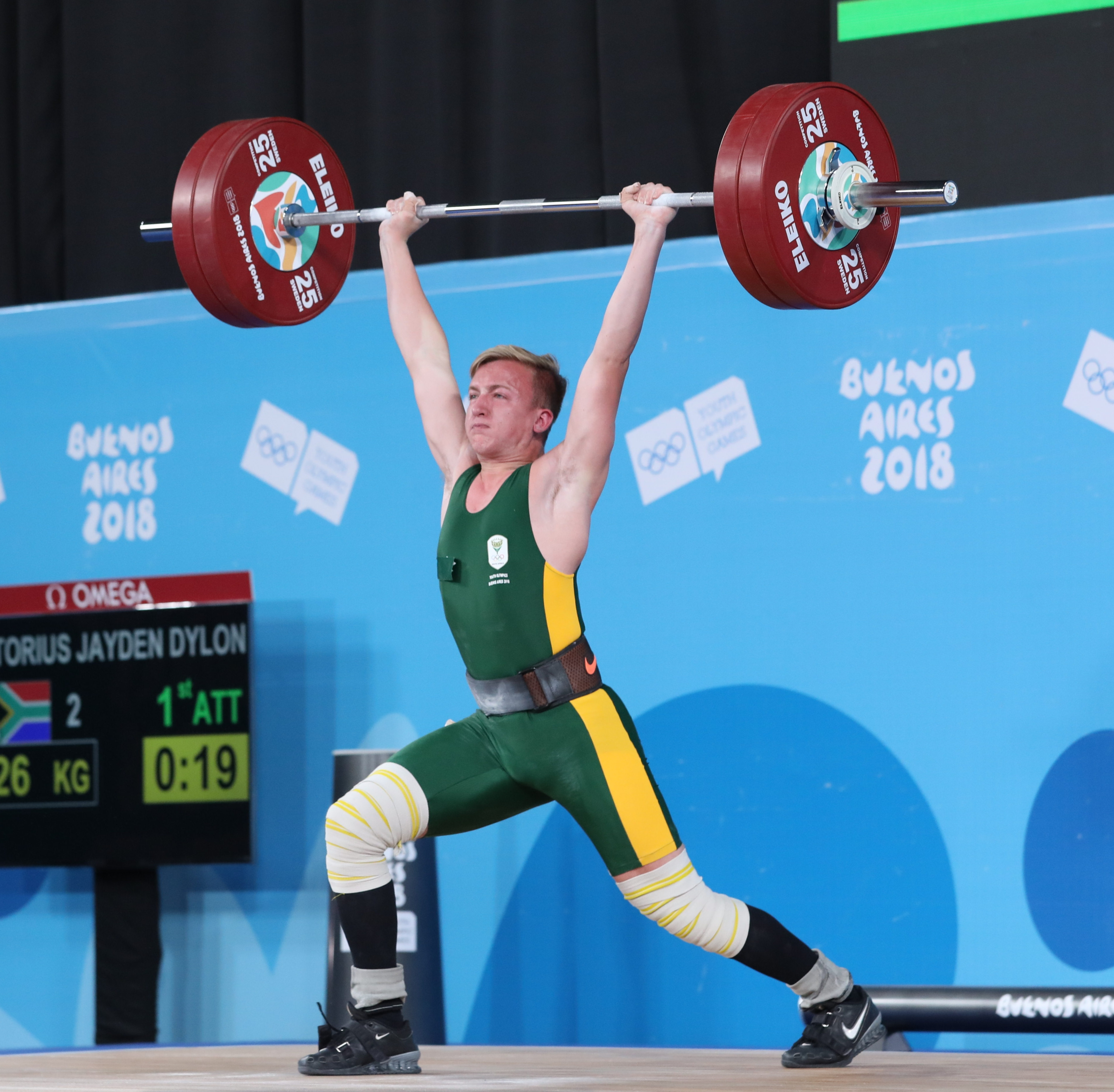
Jayden Dylon Pretorius

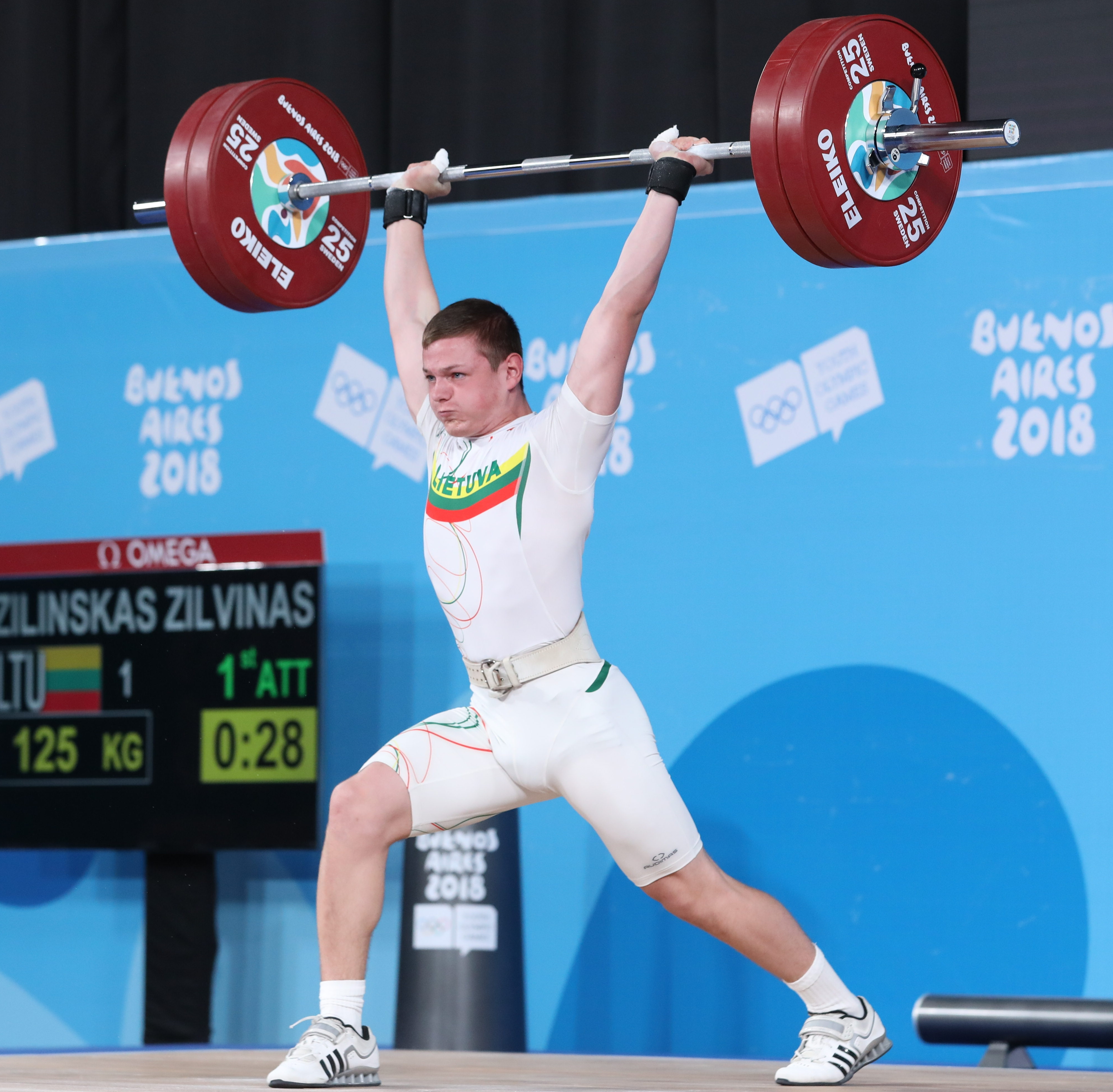
Žilvinas Žilinskas

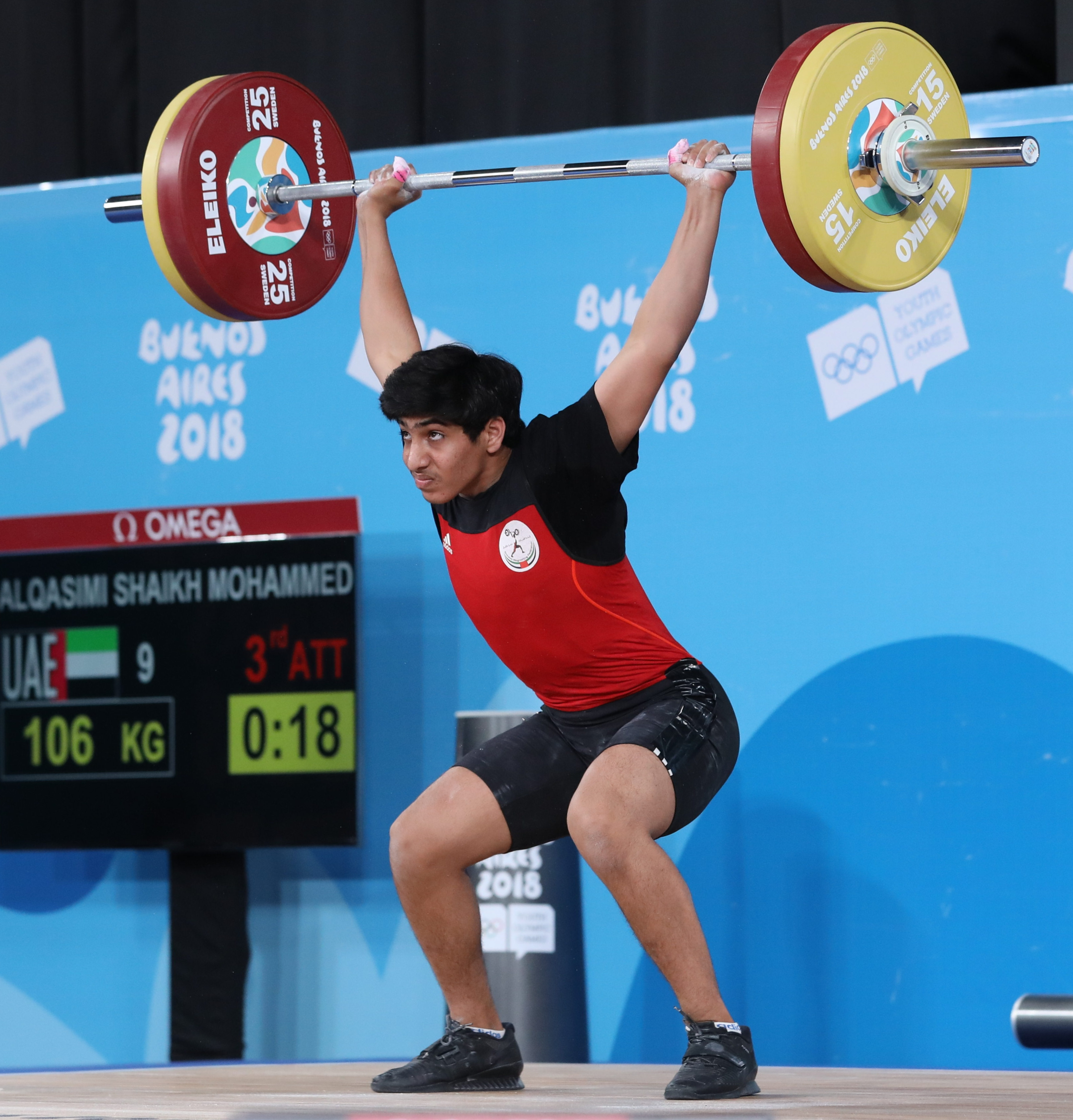
Shaikh Mohammed Al-Qasimi

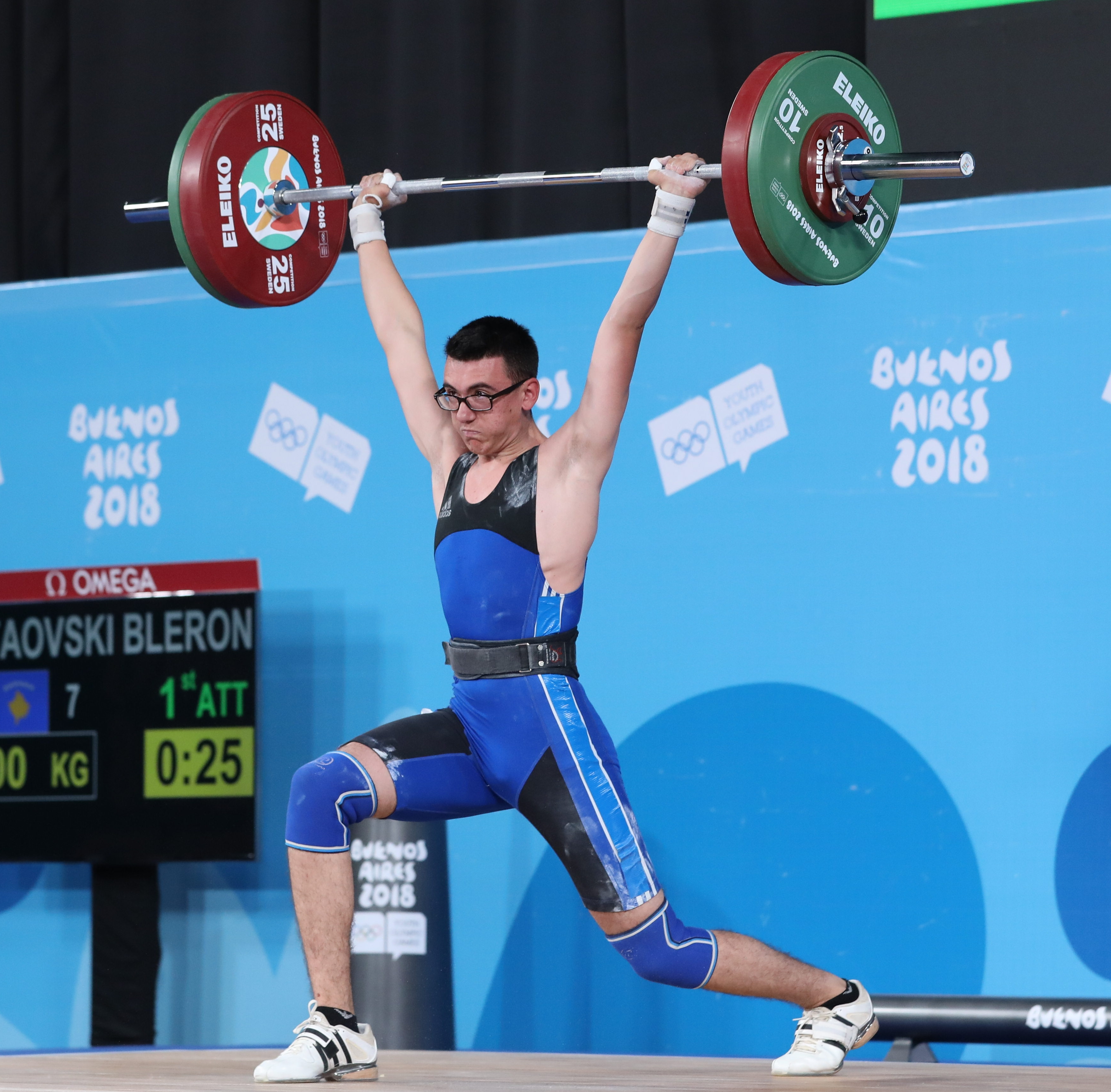
Bleron Fetaovski

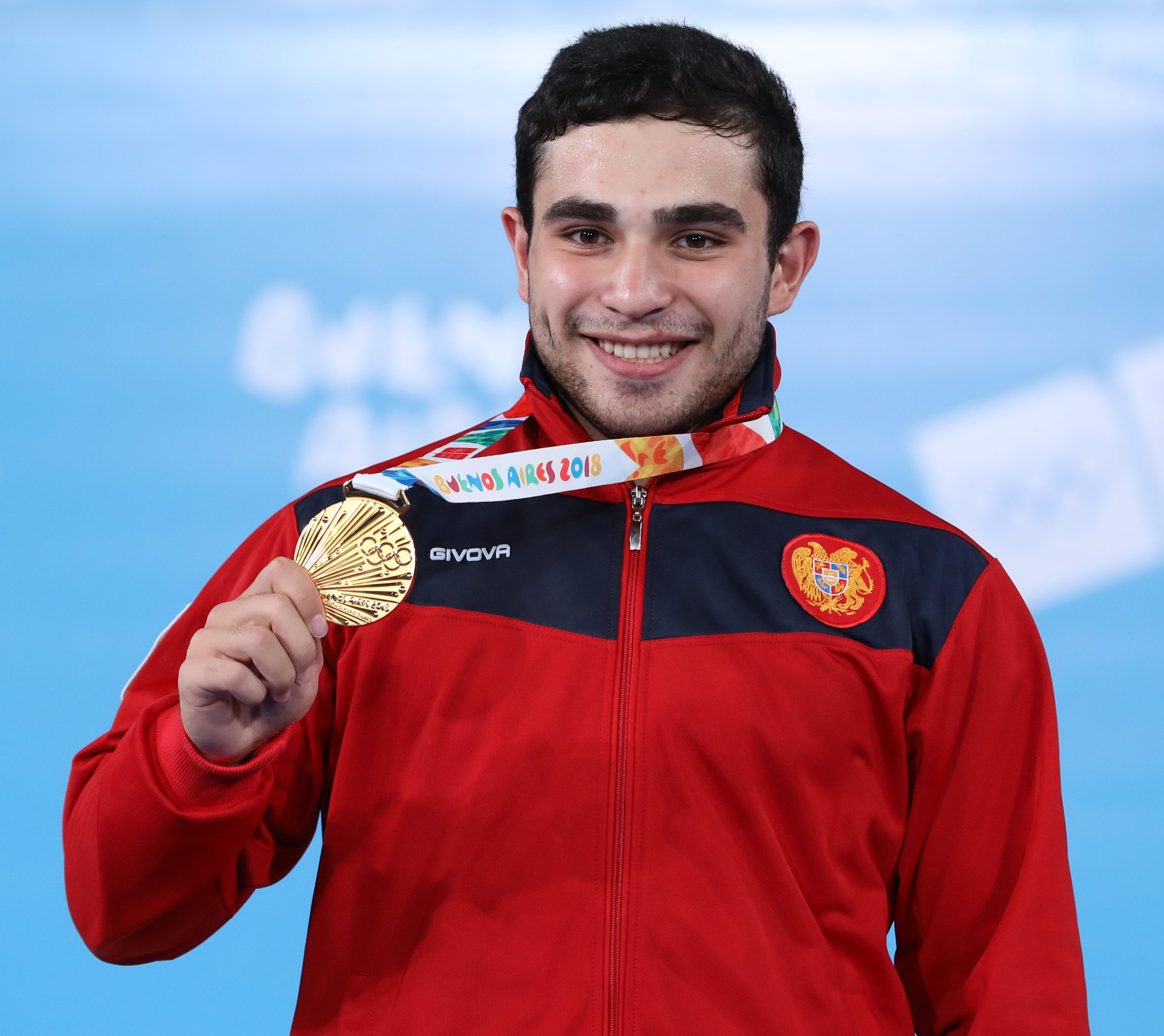
Karen Margaryan (Youth Olympic Champion)

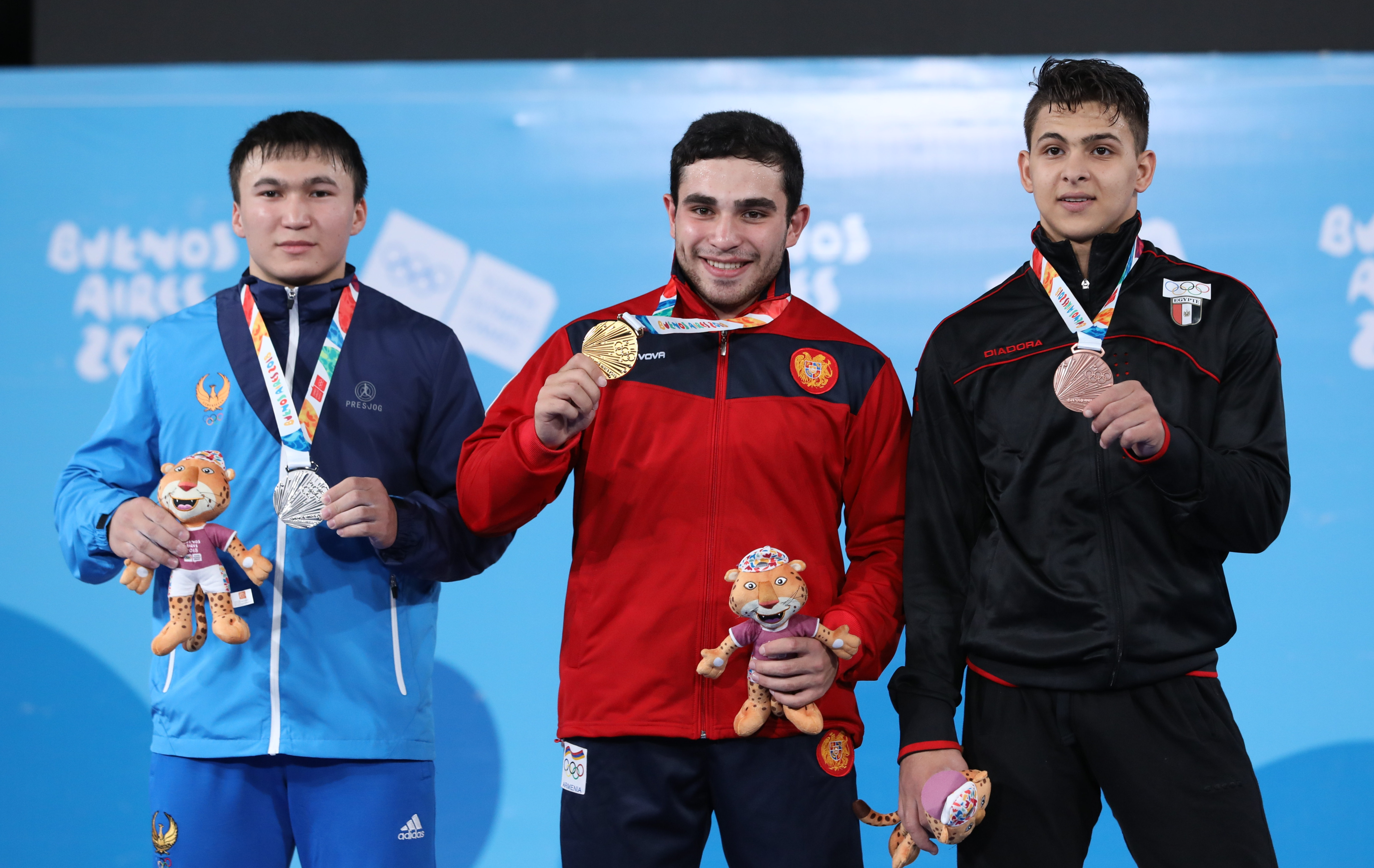
The medailists

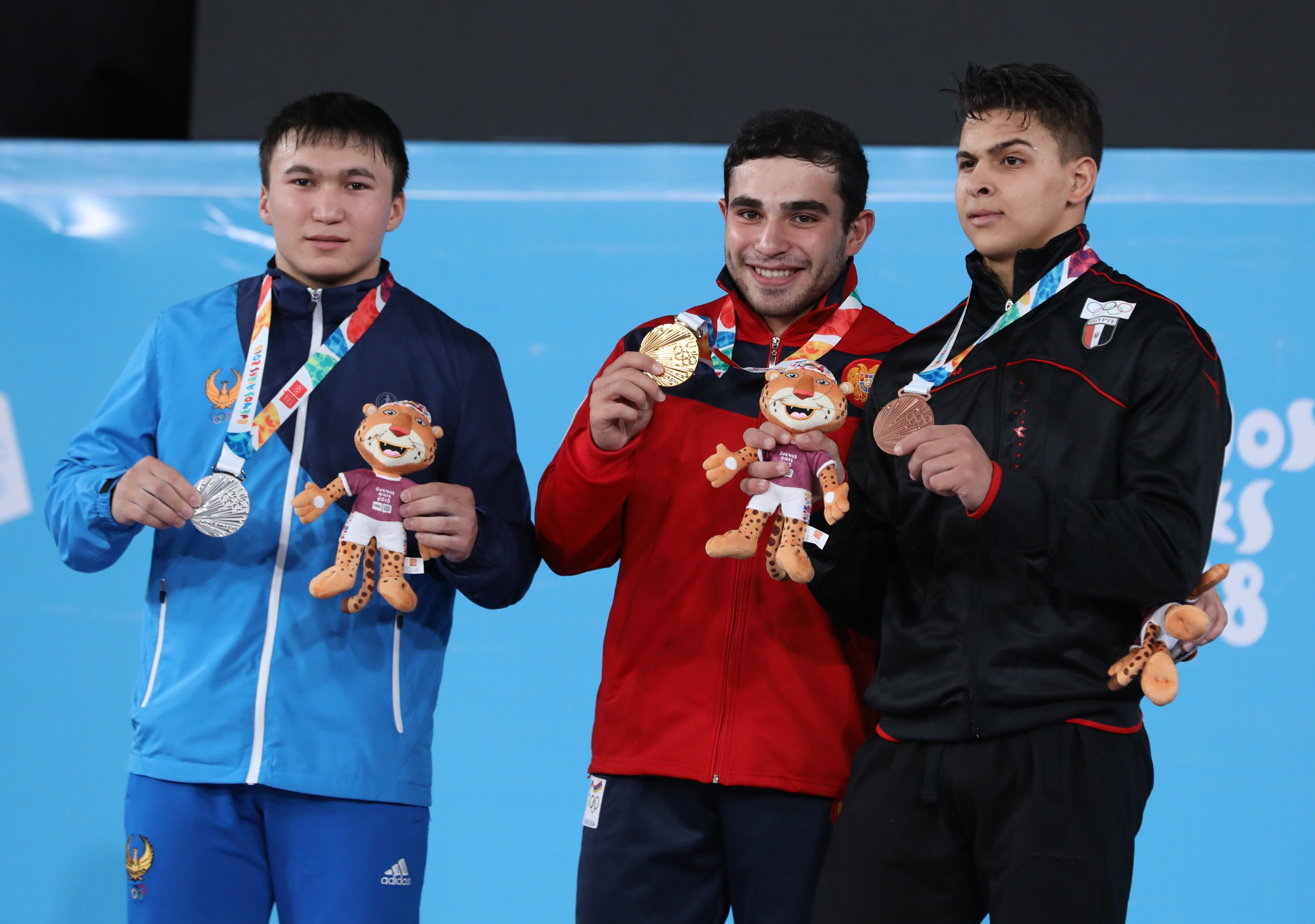
The medailists
