= Archery at the Summer Youth Olympics =

- Governing body: WA
- Events: 3 (men: 1; women: 1; mixed: 1)

Games
- 2010; 2014; 2018; 2026

Archery has been included in the Summer Youth Olympics since their inauguration. As with archery at the Summer Olympics, only the recurve is competed. Unlike the Summer Olympic competition, a mixed team event is competed, in which competitors are paired across national boundaries to create evenly matched multinational teams, as part of the Youth Olympic Games' spirit of cooperation.

== Medalists ==
Competition format:

- Olympic round (2010–)

=== Men's Individual ===
Games	Gold	Silver	Bronze
2010 Singapore	Ibrahim Sabry; Egypt	Rick van den Oever; Netherlands	Bolot Tsybzhitov; Russia
2014 Nanjing	Lee Woo-seok; South Korea	Marcus Vinicius D'Almeida; Brazil	Atul Verma; India
2018 Buenos Aires	Trenton Cowles; United States	Akash Akash; India	Senna Roos; Belgium
2026 Dakar	Maël Lamouret; France	Chen Pin-an; Chinese Taipei	Lee Ji-ho; South Korea

=== Women's Individual ===
Games	Gold	Silver	Bronze
2010 Singapore	Kwak Ye-Ji; South Korea	Tan Ya-Ting; Chinese Taipei	Tatiana Segina; Russia
2014 Nanjing	Li Jiaman; China	Melanie Gaubil; France	Lee Eun-gyeong; South Korea
2018 Buenos Aires	Zhang Mengyao; China	Èlia Canales; Spain	Son Yer-yeong; South Korea
2026 Dakar	Dünya Yenihayat; Turkey	Ye-eun Whang; United States	Sandra Pérez; Spain

=== Mixed team ===
Games	Gold	Silver	Bronze
2010 Singapore	Gloria Filippi (ITA); Anton Karoukin (BLR)	Zoi Paraskevopoulou (GRE); Gregor Rajh (SLO)	Begunhan Unsal (TUR); Abdul Dayyan Jaffar (SIN)
2014 Nanjing	Li Jiaman (CHN); Luis Gabriel Moreno (PHI)	Cynthia Freywald (GER); Muhamad Zarif Syahiir Zolkepeli (MAS)	Mirjam Tuokkola (FIN); Eric Peters (CAN)
2018 Buenos Aires	Kyla Touraine-Helias (FRA); Jose Manuel Solera (ESP)	Agustina Sofia Giannasio (ARG); Aitthiwat Soithong (THA)	Quinn Reddig (NAM); Trenton Cowles (USA)
2026 Dakar	Ye-eun Whang (USA); Aarya Arun (USA)	Aurane Lapouge (FRA); Maël Lamouret (FRA)	Kim Su-min (KOR); Lee Ji-ho (KOR)

== Medal table ==
As of the 2026 Summer Youth Olympics.

Rank	Nation	Gold	Silver	Bronze	Total
–	Mixed-NOCs	3	3	3	9
1	United States	2	1	0	3
2	South Korea	2	0	4	6
3	China	2	0	0	2
4	France	1	2	0	3
5	Egypt	1	0	0	1
5	Turkey	1	0	0	1
7	Chinese Taipei	0	2	0	2
8	India	0	1	1	2
8	Spain	0	1	1	2
10	Brazil	0	1	0	1
10	Netherlands	0	1	0	1
12	Russia	0	0	2	2
13	Belgium	0	0	1	1
Totals (13 entries)		12	12	12	36

== Venues ==
Games	Venue	Other sports hosted at venue for those games	Capacity	Ref.
2010 Singapore	Kallang Field	None	500	
2014 Nanjing	Fangshan Archery Field	None	1,000	
2018 Buenos Aires	Parque Sarmiento Archery Range	None	Not listed	
2026 Dakar	Abdoulaye Wade Stadium	None	Not listed	

== See also ==
- Archery at the Summer Olympics
- List of Olympic medalists in archery
- List of Olympic venues in archery
