= Slovenia at the 2010 Summer Youth Olympics =

- IOC code: SLO
- NOC: Slovenian Olympic Committee
- Website: www.olympic.si

in Singapore
- Competitors: 24 in 10 sports
- Flag bearer: Simon Brus
- Medals Ranked 30th: Gold 2 Silver 0 Bronze 1 Total 3

Summer Youth Olympics appearances
- 2010; 2014; 2018; 2026

Slovenia competed in the 2010 Summer Youth Olympics in Singapore.

== Medalists ==
Medal	Name	Sport	Event	Date
Gold	Jure Grace; Grega Domanjko	Rowing	Junior Men's Pair	18 Aug
Gold	Simon Brus	Canoeing	K1 Slalom Boys	25 Aug
Silver	Gregor Rajh	Archery	Mixed Team	19 Aug
Bronze	Urška Potočnik	Judo	Girls' 78kg	23 Aug

== Archery ==
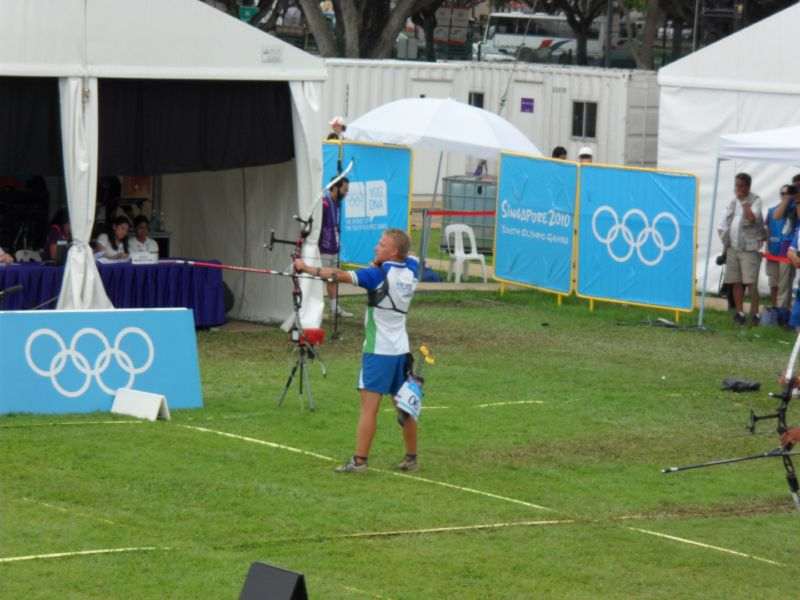
Gregor Rajh at the Junior Men's Individual archery competition at Kallang Field, Singapore

Boys

Athlete	Event	Ranking Round		Round of 32	Round of 16	Quarterfinals	Semifinals	Final	
Athlete	Event	Score	Seed	Opposition Score	Opposition Score	Opposition Score	Opposition Score	Opposition Score	Rank
Gregor Rajh	Boys’ Individual	636	6	Linster (HUN); W 6-4	Yilmaz (TUR); W 7-3	Jaffar (SIN); W 6-0	Sabry (EGY); L 2-6	Bronze Medal Match; Tsybzhitov (RUS); L 0-6	4

Girls

Athlete	Event	Ranking Round		Round of 32	Round of 16	Quarterfinals	Semifinals	Final	
Athlete	Event	Score	Seed	Opposition Score	Opposition Score	Opposition Score	Opposition Score	Opposition Score	Rank
Brina Božič	Girls’ Individual	561	23	Song (CHN); L 4-6	Did not advance				17

Mixed Team

Athlete	Event	Partner	Round of 32	Round of 16	Quarterfinals	Semifinals	Final	
Athlete	Event	Partner	Opposition Score	Opposition Score	Opposition Score	Opposition Score	Opposition Score	Rank
Gregor Rajh	Mixed Team	Zoi Paraskevopoulou (GRE)	Tukebayeva (KAZ)/ Todorov (BUL); W 6-2	Custers (NED)/ Shahnazary (ARM); W 6-4	Song (CHN)/ Pianesi (ITA); W 6-4	Alarcón (ESP)/ Milon (BAN); W 7-1	Filippi (ITA)/ Koroukin (BLR); L 3-7	Silver medal
Brina Božič	Mixed Team	Benjamin Nott (AUS)	Sichenikova (UKR)/ Chu (USA); W 6-5	Loh (SIN)/ Rivas (ESP); W 6-4	Unsal (TUR)/ Jaffar (SIN); L 2-6	Did not advance		7

== Athletics ==
=== Boys ===
Track and Road Events

Athletes	Event	Qualification		Final	
Athletes	Event	Result	Rank	Result	Rank
Žan Rudolj	Boys’ 1000m	2:24.63	3 Q	2:24.24	7

Field Events

Athletes	Event	Qualification		Final	
Athletes	Event	Result	Rank	Result	Rank
Jaka Žulič	Boys’ Discus Throw	58.25	4 Q	57.97	5

=== Girls ===
Track and Road Events

Athletes	Event	Qualification		Final	
Athletes	Event	Result	Rank	Result	Rank
Maruša Mišmaš	Girls’ 400m Hurdles	1:00.54	7 Q	1:00.69	5

Field Events

Athletes	Event	Qualification		Final	
Athletes	Event	Result	Rank	Result	Rank
Eva Vivod	Girls’ Javelin Throw	49.49	3 Q	46.70	8

== Canoeing ==
Boys

Athlete	Event	Time Trial		Round 1	Round 2 (Rep)	Round 3	Round 4	Round 5	Final	Rank
Athlete	Event	Time	Rank	Round 1	Round 2 (Rep)	Round 3	Round 4	Round 5	Final	Rank
Simon Brus	Boys’ K1 Slalom	1:25.57	1			Totka (HUN); W 1:27.81-1:43.38	Martin (GBR); W 1:25.91-1:35.40	Prskavec (CZE); W 1:25.44-1:27.62	Urban (SVK); W 1:25.15-1:30.24	Gold medal
Simon Brus	Boys’ K1 Sprint	1:37.09	16	Silva (POR); L 1:33.97-1:32.59	Urban (SVK); W 1:35.57-2:05.70	Dolata (POL); L 1:34.57-1:33.14	Did not advance			

Girls

Athlete	Event	Time Trial		Round 1	Round 2 (Rep)	Round 3	Round 4	Round 5	Final	Rank
Athlete	Event	Time	Rank	Round 1	Round 2 (Rep)	Round 3	Round 4	Round 5	Final	Rank
Ajda Novak	Girls’ K1 Slalom	1:37.86	2	Ceita (STP); W 1:39.14-2:11.50		Villumsen (DEN); W 1:38.23-1:54.23	Hostens (FRA); W 1:39.54-1:46.83	Fox (AUS); L 1:45.06-1:37.30	Wolffhardt (AUT); L 1:37.44-1:37.43	4
Ajda Novak	Girls’ K1 Sprint	1:52.10	15	Hryshyna (BLR); L 1:51.89-1:46.21	Barrera (ARG); W 1:51.34-1:57.94	Podolskaya (RUS); L 1:54.22-1:41.85	Did not advance			

== Cycling ==
Cross Country

Athlete	Event	Time	Rank	Points
Urban Ferenčak	Boys’ Cross Country	1:01:13	6	35
Nika Kožar	Girls’ Cross Country	-2LAP	25	40

Time Trial

Athlete	Event	Time	Rank	Points
Doron Hekič	Boys’ Time Trial	4:19.93	22	30
Nika Kožar	Girls’ Time Trial	3:39.20	16	39

BMX

Athlete	Event	Seeding Round		Quarterfinals							Semifinals							Final		
Athlete	Event	Seeding Round		Run 1		Run 2		Run 3		Rank	Run 1		Run 2		Run 3		Rank	Final		
Athlete	Event	Time	Rank	Time	Rank	Time	Rank	Time	Rank	Rank	Time	Rank	Time	Rank	Time	Rank	Rank	Time	Rank	Points
Rok Korošec	Boys’ BMX	40.957	23	50.313	7	41.616	6	41.847	6	6	Did not advance									72
Nika Kožar	Girls’ BMX	54.829	25	54.173	7	52.031	7	52.993	7	7	Did not advance									40

Road Race

Athlete	Event	Time	Rank	Points
Doron Hekič	Boys’ Road Race	1:05:44	9	45*
Urban Ferenčak	Boys’ Road Race	1:05:44	44	
Rok Korošec	Boys’ Road Race	1:12:18	54	

Overall

Team	Event	Cross Country Pts		Time Trial Pts		BMX Pts		Road Race Pts	Total	Rank
Team	Event	Boys	Girls	Boys	Girls	Boys	Girls	Road Race Pts	Total	Rank
Nika Kožar; Urban Ferenčak; Doron Hekič; Rok Korošec	Mixed Team	35	40	30	39	72	40	45*	301	15

- * Received -5 for finishing road race with all three racers

== Judo ==
Individual

Athlete	Event	Round 1	Round 2	Round 3	Semifinals	Final	Rank
Athlete	Event	Opposition Result	Opposition Result	Opposition Result	Opposition Result	Opposition Result	Rank
Urška Potočnik	Girls' -78 kg	BYE	Khelifi (ALG); W 001-000		Mansour (BEL); L 000-002	Bronze Medal Match; Calderon (GUA); W 010-001	

== Rowing ==
Athlete	Event	Heats		Repechage		Semifinals		Final		Overall Rank
Athlete	Event	Time	Rank	Time	Rank	Time	Rank	Time	Rank	Overall Rank
Jure Grace; Grega Domanjko	Boys' Pair	3:09.28	2 QA/B			3:18.82	2 QA	3:05.65	1	Gold medal
Tarin Čokelj	Girls' Single Sculls	3:59.18	4 QR	4:01.99	3 QC/D	4:10.63	1 QC	4:09.09	1	12

== Sailing ==
One Person Dinghy

Athlete	Event	Race												Points	Rank
Athlete	Event	1	2	3	4	5	6	7	8	9	10	11	M*	Points	Rank
Zan Luka Zelko	Boys' Byte CII	9	14	17	16	11	2	~~20~~	16	13	14	~~OCS~~	1	114	12
Eva Peternelj	Girls' Byte CII	15	18	8	7	14	16	~~21~~	~~25~~	10	15	21	19	143	18

== Swimming ==
Athletes	Event	Heat		Semifinal		Final	
Athletes	Event	Time	Position	Time	Position	Time	Position
Aleksej Koštomaj	Boys’ 200m Freestyle	1:57.42	29			Did not advance	
Aleksej Koštomaj	Boys’ 200m Individual Medley	2:10.35	22			Did not advance	
Tjaša Vozelj	Girls’ 50m Breaststroke	32.77	5 Q	32.87	6 Q	33.14	7
Tjaša Vozelj	Girls’ 100m Breaststroke	1:12.27	8 Q	1:12.28	10	Did not advance	
Tina Meža	Girls’ 50m Breaststroke	33.37	10 Q	33.31	11	Did not advance	
Tina Meža	Girls’ 100m Breaststroke	1:13.28	13 Q	1:12.33	11	Did not advance	
Katja Hajdinjak	Girls’ 50m Butterfly	28.17	7 Q	27.76	6 Q	27.86	8
Katja Hajdinjak	Girls’ 100m Butterfly	1:02.06	12 Q	1:01.50	10	Did not advance	

== Triathlon ==
Girls

Triathlete	Event	Swimming	Transit 1	Cycling	Transit 2	Running	Total time	Rank
Monika Oražem	Individual	9:34	0:32	32:11	0:27	20:25	1:03:09.83	10

Mixed

Athlete	Event	Total Times per Athlete (Swim 250 m, Bike 7 km, Run 1.7 km)	Total Group Time	Rank
Monika Oražem (SLO); Gabor Hanko (HUN); Anna Godoy (ESP); Tobias Klesen (GER)	Mixed Team Relay; Europe 3	21:05; 19:29; 22:14; 20:01	1:22:49.66	6

== Table tennis ==
Individual

Athlete	Event	Round 1		Round 2		Quarterfinals	Semifinals	Final	Rank
Athlete	Event	Group Matches	Rank	Group Matches	Rank	Quarterfinals	Semifinals	Final	Rank
Alex Galic	Girls' Singles	Jeger (CRO); L 1-3 (11-5, 10-12, 4-11, 10-12)	3 qB	Vithanage (SRI); W 3-1 (11-6, 5-11, 11-8, 11-8)	2	Did not advance			21
Alex Galic	Girls' Singles	Phan (AUS); W 3-0 (20-18, 13-11, 11-9)	3 qB	Huang (TPE); L 1-3 (7-11, 3-11, 13-11, 9-11)	2	Did not advance			21
Alex Galic	Girls' Singles	Meshref (EGY); L 2-3 (3-11, 11-9, 9-11, 11-5, 7-11)	3 qB	Wu (NZL); W 3-0 (11-2, 11-5, 11-7)	2	Did not advance			21

Team

Athlete	Event	Round 1		Round 2	Quarterfinals	Semifinals	Final	Rank
Athlete	Event	Group Matches	Rank	Round 2	Quarterfinals	Semifinals	Final	Rank
Europe 6 Alex Galic (SLO); Stefan Leitgeb (AUT)	Mixed Team	France; Peng (FRA); Gauzy (FRA); L 1-2 (0-3, 0-3, 3-2)	3 qB	Pan America 3 Rosheuvel (GUY); Tapia (ECU); W 2-0 (3-0, 3-0)	Pan America 1 Hsing (USA); Gavilan (PAR); W 2-0 (3-2, 3-1)	Did not advance		17
Europe 6 Alex Galic (SLO); Stefan Leitgeb (AUT)	Mixed Team	Intercontinental 3 Phan (AUS); Mejia (ESA); W 3-0 (3-0, 3-1, 3-0)	3 qB	Pan America 3 Rosheuvel (GUY); Tapia (ECU); W 2-0 (3-0, 3-0)	Pan America 1 Hsing (USA); Gavilan (PAR); W 2-0 (3-2, 3-1)	Did not advance		17
Europe 6 Alex Galic (SLO); Stefan Leitgeb (AUT)	Mixed Team	Europe 2 Xiao (POR); Vanrossomme (BEL); L 0-3 (0-3, 1-3, 2-3)	3 qB	Pan America 3 Rosheuvel (GUY); Tapia (ECU); W 2-0 (3-0, 3-0)	Pan America 1 Hsing (USA); Gavilan (PAR); W 2-0 (3-2, 3-1)	Did not advance		17
