= Bangladesh at the 2010 Summer Youth Olympics =

- IOC code: BAN
- NOC: Bangladesh Olympic Association

in Singapore
- Competitors: 6 in 3 sports
- Flag bearer: Sadia Sultana
- Medals: Gold 0 Silver 0 Bronze 0 Total 0

Summer Youth Olympics appearances
- 2010; 2014; 2018

Bangladesh participated in the 2010 Summer Youth Olympics in Singapore. The team included six athletes competing in three sports.

== Archery ==
Boys

Athlete	Event	Ranking Round		Round of 32	Round of 16	Quarterfinals	Semifinals	Final	
Athlete	Event	Score	Seed	Opposition Score	Opposition Score	Opposition Score	Opposition Score	Opposition Score	Rank
Md. Emdadul Haque Milon	Boys’ Individual	628	12	Park (CAN); W 6-2	Hautamaki (FIN); W 6-0	Tsybzhitov (RUS); L 0-6	Did not advance		7

Girls

Athlete	Event	Ranking Round		Round of 32	Round of 16	Quarterfinals	Semifinals	Final	
Athlete	Event	Score	Seed	Opposition Score	Opposition Score	Opposition Score	Opposition Score	Opposition Score	Rank
Beauty Ray	Girls’ Individual	516	29	Avitia (MEX); L 0-6	Did not advance				17

Mixed Team

Athlete	Event	Partner	Round of 32	Round of 16	Quarterfinals	Semifinals	Final	
Athlete	Event	Partner	Opposition Score	Opposition Score	Opposition Score	Opposition Score	Opposition Score	Rank
Md. Emdadul Haque Milon	Mixed Team	Miriam Alarcón (ESP)	Ray (BAN)/ Nesbitt (GBR); W 6-4	Wojnicka (POL)/ Yilmaz (TUR); W 7-3	Ingley (AUS)/ Koiwa (JPN); W 6-5	Paraskevopoulou (GRE)/ Rajh (SLO); L 1-7	Bronze Medal Match; Unsal (TUR)/ Jaffar (SIN); L 5-6	4
Beauty Ray	Mixed Team	Mark Nesbitt (GBR)	Alarcón (ESP)/ Milon (BAN); L 4-6	Did not advance				17

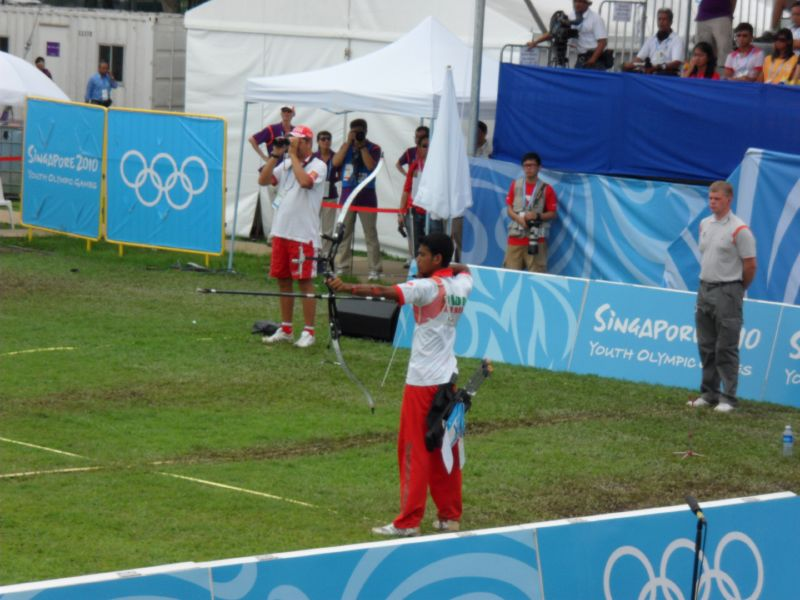
Emdadul Haque Milon

== Shooting ==
Rifle

Athlete	Event	Qualification		Final		
Athlete	Event	Score	Rank	Score	Total	Rank
Sadiya Sultana	Girls' 10m Air Rifle	390	10	Did not advance		

== Swimming ==
Athletes	Event	Heat		Semifinal		Final	
Athletes	Event	Time	Position	Time	Position	Time	Position
Mahfizur Rahman Sagor	Boys’ 50m Freestyle	25.12	29	Did not advance			
Juwel Ahmed	Boys’ 50m Butterfly	28.66	16 Q	28.19	15	Did not advance	
Juwel Ahmed	Boys’ 100m Butterfly	1:02.97	31	Did not advance			
Sonia Aktar	Girls’ 50m Butterfly	32.93	21	Did not advance			
Sonia Aktar	Girls’ 100m Butterfly	1:14.52	32	Did not advance			
