= Archery at the 2010 Summer Youth Olympics – Mixed team =

Mixed team at the I Summer Youth Olympic Games
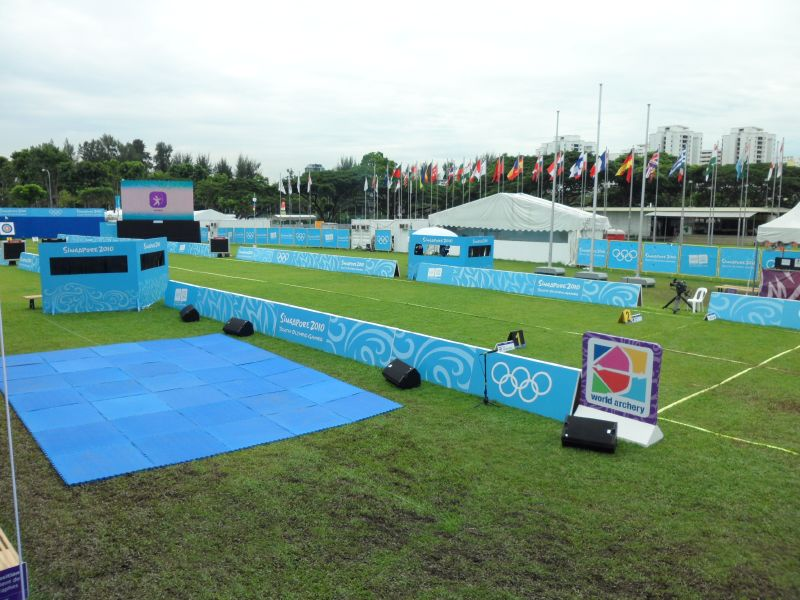
- View of Kallang Field, where the event took place, during the 2010 Summer Youth Olympics
- Venue: Kallang Field
- Date: 18–19 August
- Competitors: 64 from 41 nations
- Teams: 32

Medalists
1st place, gold medalist(s)		Gloria Filippi	Italy
1st place, gold medalist(s)		Anton Karoukin	Belarus
2nd place, silver medalist(s)		Zoi Paraskevopoulou	Greece
2nd place, silver medalist(s)		Gregor Rajh	Slovenia
3rd place, bronze medalist(s)		Begunhan Unsal	Turkey
3rd place, bronze medalist(s)		Abdul Dayyan Jaffar	Singapore

The Mixed team archery event at the 2010 Summer Youth Olympics was part of the archery programme. It took place at the Kallang Field. Early rounds were on 18 August 2010. elimination rounds took place on 19 August. All archery was done at a range of 70 metres, with targets 1.22 metres in diameter.

== Results ==
=== Seeding ===
Seeds were determined by adding the scores of the teammates based on the ranking rounds of the boys and girls events. With the exception of the bottom seed players were partnered in an attempt to make all the teams even based on their combined score.

Seed	Female Archer	Score	Male Archer	Score	Total Score
1	Jia Song (CHN)	619	Lorenzo Pianesi (ITA)	598	1217
2	Gloria Filippi (ITA)	623	Anton Karoukin (BLR)	591	1214
3	Tze Rong Vanessa Loh (SIN)	601	Carlos Rivas (ESP)	611	1212
4	Erwina Safitri (INA)	601	Vitaliy Komonyuk (UKR)	610	1211
5	Miriam Alarcón (ESP)	581	Mohammed Emdadul Haque Milon (BAN)	628	1209
6	Nynn Sophie Holdt-Caspersen (DEN)	602	Julien Rossignol (FRA)	606	1208
7	Laurie Lecointre (FRA)	592	Axel Muller (SUI)	616	1208
8	Farida Tukebayeva (KAZ)	635	Teodor Todorov (BUL)	572	1207
9	Maud Custers (NED)	594	Vasil Shahnazaryan (ARM)	613	1207
10	Zoe Gobbels (BEL)	603	Frantisek Hajduk (CZE)	603	1206
11	Begunhan Unsal (TUR)	588	Abdul Dayyan Jaffar (SIN)	618	1206
12	Aleksandra Wojnicka (POL)	575	Yagiz Yilmaz (TUR)	631	1206
13	Isabel Viehmeier (GER)	604	Timon Park (CAN)	601	1205
14	Lidiia Sichenikova (UKR)	627	Ben Chu (USA)	577	1204
15	Alexandra Mirca (MDA)	626	Benjamin Hindborg Ipsen (DEN)	577	1203
16	Mai Okubo (JPN)	583	Yuan-Hsiang Ku (TPE)	620	1203
17	Mariana Avitia (MEX)	637	Joni Hautamaki (FIN)	559	1196
18	Yasaman Shirian (IRI)	565	Ibrahim Sabry (EGY)	631	1196
19	Brina Bozic (SLO)	561	Benjamin Nott (AUS)	634	1195
20	Alice Ingley (AUS)	560	Tsukushi Koiwa (JPN)	635	1195
21	Seema Verma (IND)	635	Sebastian Linster (HUN)	559	1194
22	Tatiana Segina (RUS)	639	Maciej Jaworski (POL)	553	1192
23	Iryna Hul (BLR)	554	Siyue Luo (CHN)	636	1190
24	Miranda Leek (USA)	550	Atanu Das (IND)	637	1187
25	Zoi Paraskevopoulou (GRE)	551	Gregor Rajh (SLO)	636	1187
26	Tanja Sorsa (FIN)	548	Bolot Tsybzhitov (RUS)	638	1186
27	Ya-Ting Tan (TPE)	648	Tanapat Harikul (THA)	535	1183
28	Beauty Ray (BAN)	516	Mark Nesbitt (GBR)	638	1154
29	Aya Kamel (EGY)	492	Rick van den Oever (NED)	653	1145
30	Kristina Zaynutdinova (TJK)	494	Min Beom Park (KOR)	651	1145
31	Ye Ji Kwak (KOR)	670	Aung Gyi (MYA)	412	1082
32	Elizabeth Cheok (SIN)	0	Jafet Farjat (MEX)	312	312

=== Draw ===
==== Finals ====
Semifinals
25	Zoi Paraskevopoulou (GRE); Gregor Rajh (SLO)	7 (37,35,36,34)
5	Miriam Alarcón (ESP); Emdadul Haque Milon (BAN)	1 (35,35,33,33)
11	Begunhan Unsal (TUR); Abdul Dayyan Jaffar (SIN)	2 (26,24,27,26)
2	Gloria Filippi (ITA); Anton Karoukin (BLR)	6 (30,27,27,26)

Final
25	Zoi Paraskevopoulou (GRE); Gregor Rajh (SLO)	3 (31,38,37,33,34)
2	Gloria Filippi (ITA); Anton Karoukin (BLR)	7 (36,35,37,39,37)
Bronze medal match
5	Miriam Alarcón (ESP); Emdadul Haque Milon (BAN)	5^{T19} (36,35,31,33,39)
11	Begunhan Unsal (TUR); Abdul Dayyan Jaffar (SIN)	6^{T20} (33,35,32,35,33)

==== Top half ====
First Round
1	Jia Song (CHN); Lorenzo Pianesi (ITA)	6 (35,35,34)
32	Elizabeth Cheok (SIN); Jarfet Farjat (MEX)	0 (33,32,33)
17	Mariana Avitia (MEX); Joni Hautamaki (FIN)	0 (34,31,34)
16	Mai Okubo (JPN); Yuan-Hsiang Ku (TPE)	6 (36,36,35)
9	Maud Custers (NED); Vasil Shahnazaryan (ARM)	6 (37,35,37,36,39)
24	Miranda Leek (USA); Atanu Das (IND)	4 (33,33,39,37,36)
25	Zoi Paraskevopoulou (GRE); Gregor Rajh (SLO)	6 (36,33,32,36)
8	Farida Tukebayeva (KAZ); Teodor Todorov (BUL)	2 (36,33,30,33)
5	Miriam Alarcón (ESP); Emdadul Haque Milon (BAN)	6 (34,32,37,35,34)
28	Beauty Ray (BAN); Mark Nesbitt (GBR)	4 (35,33,36,31,33)
21	Seema Verma (IND); Sebastian Linster (HUN)	2 (33,35,39,35)
12	Aleksandra Wojnicka (POL); Yagiz Yilmaz (TUR)	6 (34,36,36,36)
13	Isabel Viehmeier (GER); Timon Park (CAN)	3 (35,36,36,36,35)
20	Alice Ingley (AUS); Tsukushi Koiwa (JPN)	7 (35,38,34,37,37)
29	Aya Kamel (EGY); Rick van den Oever (NED)	6^{T19} (32,30,37,37,37)
4	Erwina Safitri (INA); Vitaliy Komonyuk (UKR)	5 ^{T17} (38,32,37,36,32)

Second Round
1	Jia Song (CHN); Lorenzo Pianesi (ITA)	6 (34,37,35)
16	Mai Okubo (JPN); Yuan-Hsiang Ku (TPE)	0 (33,35,31)
9	Maud Custers (NED); Vasil Shahnazaryan (ARM)	4 (32,34,23,34,32)
25	Zoi Paraskevopoulou (GRE); Gregor Rajh (SLO)	6 (33,32,28,29,35)
5	Miriam Alarcón (ESP); Emdadul Haque Milon (BAN)	7 (34,34,31,36,33)
12	Aleksandra Wojnicka (POL); Yagiz Yilmaz (TUR)	3 (35,33,31,28,30)
20	Alice Ingley (AUS); Tsukushi Koiwa (JPN)	7 (32,37,30,32,34)
29	Aya Kamel (EGY); Rick van den Oever (NED)	3 (28,31,31,32,33)

Quarterfinals
1	Jia Song (CHN); Lorenzo Pianesi (ITA)	4 (33,35,32,32,32)
25	Zoi Paraskevopoulou (GRE); Gregor Rajh (SLO)	6 (31,33,35,35,33)
5	Miriam Alarcón (ESP); Emdadul Haque Milon (BAN)	6^{T14} (35,23,31,32,36)
20	Alice Ingley (AUS); Tsukushi Koiwa (JPN)	5^{T12} (28,28,32,32,30)

Semifinals
25	Zoi Paraskevopoulou (GRE); Gregor Rajh (SLO)	7 (37,35,36,34)
5	Miriam Alarcón (ESP); Emdadul Haque Milon (BAN)	1 (35,35,33,33)

==== Bottom half ====
First Round
3	Tze Rong Vanessa Loh (SIN); Carlos Rivas (ESP)	7 (35,36,32,33,34)
30	Kristina Zaynutdinova (TJK); Min Beom Park (KOR)	3 (33,29,36,33,32)
19	Brina Bozic (SLO); Benjamin Nott (AUS)	6^{T17} (38,35,34,34,34)
14	Lidiia Sichenikova (UKR); Ben Chu (USA)	5^{T16} (39,33,37,34,33)
11	Begunhan Unsal (TUR); Abdul Dayyan Jaffar (SIN)	6 (36,37,33,36,32)
22	Tatiana Segina (RUS); Maciej Jaworski (POL)	4 (38,35,33,36,30)
27	Ya-Ting Tan (TPE); Tanapat Harikul (THA)	4 (33,34,36,34,34)
6	Nynn Holdt-Caspersen (DEN); Julien Rossignol (FRA)	6 (32,32,38,36,35)
7	Laurie Lecointre (FRA); Axel Muller (SUI)	4 (34,34,38,35,33)
26	Tanja Sorsa (FIN); Bolot Tsybzhitov (RUS)	6 (34,34,33,36,36)
23	Iryna Hul (BLR); Siyue Luo (CHN)	6 (35,33,27,35)
10	Zoe Gobbels (BEL); Frantisek Hajduk (CZE)	2 (30,19,30,34)
15	Alexandra Mirca (MDA); Benjamin Hindborg Ipsen (DEN)	6^{T18} (29,36,32,34,36)
18	Yasaman Shirian (IRI); Ibrahim Sabry (EGY)	5^{T16} (35,33,37,31,36)
31	Ye Ji Kwak (KOR); Aung Gyi (MYA)	0 (36,31,26)
2	Gloria Filippi (ITA); Anton Karoukin (BLR)	6 (37,33,37)

Second Round
3	Tze Rong Vanessa Loh (SIN); Carlos Rivas (ESP)	4 (26,31,32,29,33)
19	Brina Bozoic (SLO); Benjamin Nott (AUS)	6 (31,27,30,32,34)
11	Begunhan Unsal (TUR); Abdul Dayyan Jaffar (SIN)	6 (34,35,33,34)
6	NynnSophie Holdt-Caspersen (DEN); Julien Rossignol (FRA)	2 (32,34,36,32)
26	Tanja Sorsa (FIN); Bolot Tsybzhitov (RUS)	5^{T18} (31,34,33,34,35)
23	Iryna Hul (BLR); Siyue Luo (CHN)	6^{T20} (33,33,33,34,35)
15	Alexandra Mirca (MDA); Benjamin Hindborg Ipsen (DEN)	4 (31,36,34,35,36)
2	Gloria Filippi (ITA); Anton Karoukin (BLR)	6 (32,33,33,37,37)

Quarterfinals
19	Brina Bozic (SLO); Benjamin Nott (AUS)	2 (37,32,35,35)
11	Begunhan Unsal (TUR); Abdul Dayyan Jaffar (SIN)	6 (38,34,34,36)
23	Iryna Hul (BLR); Siyue Luo (CHN)	2 (34,35,33,31)
2	Gloria Filippi (ITA); Anton Karoukin (BLR)	6 (37,30,36,38)

Semifinals
11	Begunhan Unsal (TUR); Abdul Dayyan Jaffar (SIN)	2 (26,24,27,26)
2	Gloria Filippi (ITA); Anton Karoukin (BLR)	6 (30,27,27,26)
