= Finland at the 2010 Summer Youth Olympics =

- IOC code: FIN
- NOC: Finnish Olympic Committee
- Website: www.noc.fi

in Singapore
- Competitors: 19 in 8 sports
- Flag bearer: Niki Blassar
- Medals Ranked 83rd: Gold 0 Silver 0 Bronze 2 Total 2

Summer Youth Olympics appearances
- 2010; 2014; 2018; 2026

Finland participated in the 2010 Summer Youth Olympics in Singapore.

The Finnish squad consisted of 19 athletes competing in 8 sports: aquatics (swimming), archery, athletics, badminton, gymnastics, sailing, shooting and wrestling.

== Medalists ==
Medal	Name	Sport	Event	Date
Bronze	Petra Olli	Wrestling	Girls' Freestyle 46kg	16 Aug
Bronze	Jussi Kanervo	Athletics	Boys' 110m Hurdles	21 Aug

== Archery ==
Boys

Athlete	Event	Ranking Round		Round of 32	Round of 16	Quarterfinals	Semifinals	Final	
Athlete	Event	Score	Seed	Opposition Score	Opposition Score	Opposition Score	Opposition Score	Opposition Score	Rank
Joni Hautamaki	Boys’ Individual	559	28	Das (IND); W 6-5	Milon (BAN); L 0-6	Did not advance			9

Girls

Athlete	Event	Ranking Round		Round of 32	Round of 16	Quarterfinals	Semifinals	Final	
Athlete	Event	Score	Seed	Opposition Score	Opposition Score	Opposition Score	Opposition Score	Opposition Score	Rank
Tanja Sorsa	Girls’ Individual	548	29	Verma (IND); L 0-6	Did not advance				17

Mixed Team

Athlete	Event	Partner	Round of 32	Round of 16	Quarterfinals	Semifinals	Final	
Athlete	Event	Partner	Opposition Score	Opposition Score	Opposition Score	Opposition Score	Opposition Score	Rank
Joni Hautamaki	Mixed Team	Mariana Avitia (MEX)	Okubo (JPN)/ Ku (TPE); L 0-6	Did not advance				17
Tanja Sorsa	Mixed Team	Bolot Tsybzhitov (RUS)	Lecointre (FRA)/ Muller (SUI); W 6-4	Hul (BLR)/ Luo (CHN); L 5-6	Did not advance			9

== Athletics ==
=== Boys ===
Track and Road Events

Athletes	Event	Qualification		Final	
Athletes	Event	Result	Rank	Result	Rank
Jussi Kanervo	Boys’ 110m Hurdles	13.63	2 Q	13.53	Bronze medal
Oskari Mörö	Boys’ 400m Hurdles	52.70	3 Q	DSQ	

Field Events

Athletes	Event	Qualification		Final	
Athletes	Event	Result	Rank	Result	Rank
Arttu Kangas	Boys’ Shot Put	19.93	7 Q	20.45	5
Mikko Torronen	Boys’ Discus Throw	56.80	5 Q	56.03	7
Tuomas Keto	Boys’ Javelin Throw	65.56	15 qB	78.03	9
Ilmari Lahtinen	Boys’ Hammer Throw	NM qB		64.72	12

=== Girls ===
Field Events

Athletes	Event	Qualification		Final	
Athletes	Event	Result	Rank	Result	Rank
Junia Koivu	Girls’ Hammer Throw	51.14	9 Q	52.19	5

== Badminton ==
Boys

Athlete	Event	Group Stage				Knock-Out Stage			
Athlete	Event	Match 1	Match 2	Match 3	Rank	Quarterfinal	Semifinal	Final	Rank
Kasper Lehikoinen	Boys’ Singles	Ma (AUS) W 2-0 (21-4, 21-5)	Hsieh (TPE) L 0-2 (14-21, 14-21)	Kariyawasam (SRI) W 2-0 (21-8, 21-13)	2	Did not advance			

Girls

Athlete	Event	Group Stage				Knock-Out Stage			
Athlete	Event	Match 1	Match 2	Match 3	Rank	Quarterfinal	Semifinal	Final	Rank
Airi Mikkelä	Girls’ Singles	Volkanovska (MKD) W 2-0 (21-10, 21-5)	Marín (ESP) L 0-2 (8-21, 11-21)	Pilven (AUS) W 2-0 (21-18, 21-16)	2	Did not advance			

== Gymnastics ==
=== Artistic Gymnastics ===
Girls

Athlete	Event	Vault		Uneven Bars		Beam		Floor		Total	
Athlete	Event	Score	Rank	Score	Rank	Score	Rank	Score	Rank	Score	Rank
Erika Pakkala	Girls' Qualification	13.600	12	11.150	29	12.050	33	12.500	19	49.300	26

== Sailing ==
One Person Dinghy

Athlete	Event	Race												Points	Rank
Athlete	Event	1	2	3	4	5	6	7	8	9	10	11	M*	Points	Rank
Kaarle Tapper	Boys' Byte CII	8	3	3	~~20~~	1	10	11	8	~~14~~	9	2	11	66	4
Niki Blassar	Girls' Byte CII	~~23~~	~~20~~	6	16	3	7	5	2	12	17	8	12	88	8

== Shooting ==
Rifle

Athlete	Event	Qualification			Final		
Athlete	Event	Score	Shoot-Off	Rank	Score	Total	Rank
Jaakko Bjorkbacka	Boys' 10m Air Rifle	587	45.1	9	Did not advance		

== Swimming ==
Athletes	Event	Heat		Semifinal		Final	
Athletes	Event	Time	Position	Time	Position	Time	Position
Matti Mattsson	Boys’ 100m Breaststroke	1:04.17	7 Q	1:04.39	9	Did not advance	
Matti Mattsson	Boys’ 200m Breaststroke	2:18.64	7 Q			2:18.47	8
Lotta Nevalainen	Girls’ 50m Freestyle	26.85	9 Q	26.60	10	Did not advance	
Lotta Nevalainen	Girls’ 100m Freestyle	58.46	17	Did not advance			
Lotta Nevalainen	Girls’ 50m Backstroke	30.32	8 Q	30.22	7 Q	30.35	8
Lotta Nevalainen	Girls’ 100m Backstroke	1:04.93	15 Q	1:05.96	16	Did not advance	
Noora Laukkanen	Girls’ 50m Breaststroke	33.64	15 Q	33.22	9	Did not advance	
Noora Laukkanen	Girls’ 100m Breaststroke	1:11.73	7 Q	1:11.75	7 Q	1:11.39	7
Noora Laukkanen	Girls’ 200m Breaststroke	2:37.46	11			Did not advance	
Noora Laukkanen	Girls’ 100m Butterfly	1:02.30	15 Q	1:02.33	15	Did not advance	

== Wrestling ==
Girls' Freestyle

Athlete	Event	Pools		Final	Rank
Athlete	Event	Groups	Rank	Final	Rank
Petra Olli	Girls' 46kg	Yu Miyahara (JPN); L Fall (1-1+, 0-5)	2	Bronze medal contest Laura Mertens (GER); W 2-1 (2-4, 3-0, 1-0)	
Petra Olli	Girls' 46kg	Oriannys Segura (VEN); W 2-0 (1-0, 5-1)	2	Bronze medal contest Laura Mertens (GER); W 2-1 (2-4, 3-0, 1-0)	
