= Archery at the 2010 Summer Youth Olympics – Girls' individual =

Girls' individual at the I Summer Youth Olympic Games
- Venue: Kallang Field
- Date: 18–20 August 2010
- Competitors: 31 from 31 nations

Medalists
1st place, gold medalist(s)		Kwak Ye-ji	South Korea
2nd place, silver medalist(s)		Tan Ya-ting	Chinese Taipei
3rd place, bronze medalist(s)		Tatiana Segina	Russia

The girls' individual archery event at the 2010 Summer Youth Olympics was held from 18 to 20 August 2010 at the Kallang Field in Kallang, Singapore. It was one of three recurve archery events which comprised the archery programme at the inaugural Summer Youth Olympics, and featured thirty-one archers from thirty-one countries. Entry was open to female archers born between 1 January 1992 and 31 December 1993.

Qualification was conducted through a tournament held in parallel at the 2009 Archery World Youth Championships, as well as through five continental tournaments held in 2009 and 2010. The event was among the first to follow the new competition format adopted by the Federation Internationale Tir de l'Arc (FITA) for international tournaments earlier in 2010.

Kwak Ye-ji of South Korea, who was tipped as the favourite for gold medal, emerged as champion after winning in the final against Tan Ya-ting of Chinese Taipei, who received the silver medal as runner-up. Russia's Tatiana Segina finished in third place, winning the bronze medal ahead of Mexico's Mariana Avitia.

== Format ==
Targets used in FITA competitions were 122cm wide and were divided into ten evenly-spaced concentric rings. Shooting an arrow into the outermost ring scored one point; landing in the centre yellow circle earned the maximum ten points.

The girls' individual recurve event was an outdoor recurve target archery event. Held to FITA-approved rules, the archers shot at a 122 cm-wide target from a distance of 70 metres, with between one and ten points being awarded for each arrow depending on how close it landed to the centre of the target. The competition took place over two days, with an initial ranking round being followed by a single-elimination tournament consisting of five rounds and concluding with two matches to determine the winners of the gold, silver, and bronze medals. The ranking round was held on 18 August and determined the seeds for the elimination rounds, which also began on 18 August and concluded two days later. Each of the thirty-one archers shot a total of 72 arrows. The archer with the highest scoring total from her 72 arrows received the number one seed, the archer with the second highest total receiving second seed, and so on. In the event of a tie between two or more archers, the number of arrows shot in the central 10-ring of the target was taken into account, with the number of arrows shot within the inner-10 (or X) ring used as a second tiebreaker if necessary.

The format of the elimination and medal-deciding rounds followed the Archery Olympic Round set system that had been recently introduced in international World Archery events. The elimination rounds began on 18 August with the 1/16 round and concluded two days later on 20 August, with the bronze and gold medal finals following afterwards. Each match consisted of a maximum of five sets, with archers each shooting three arrows per set. The archer with the greater score from their three arrows won the set, earning two set points. The archer with the lower score in each set received zero points. If the score was tied, each archer received one point. The first archer to reach six set points was declared the winner. If the match was tied at five set points each after the maximum five sets were played, a single tie-breaker arrow was used with the closest to centre of the target winning.

=== Schedule ===
Day	Date	Start time	Stage
4	Wednesday, 18 August 2010	11:00	Ranking round
4	Wednesday, 18 August 2010	14:12	1/16 elimination round
6	Friday, 20 August 2010	11:00	1/8 elimination round
6	Friday, 20 August 2010	14:30	Quarter-finals
6	Friday, 20 August 2010	15:26	Semi-finals
6	Friday, 20 August 2010	15:58	Bronze medal match
6	Friday, 20 August 2010	16:12	Gold medal match

== Report ==
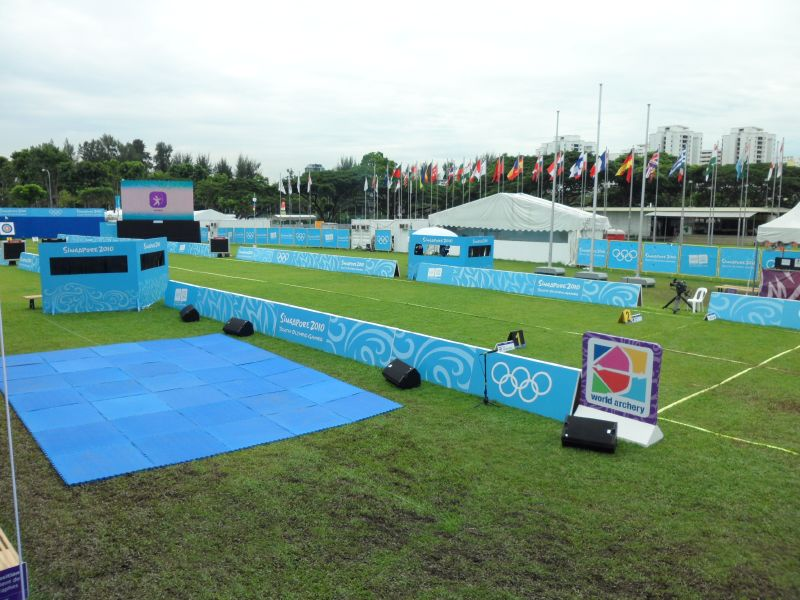
Kallang Field was the host of the three archery events at the 2010 Summer Youth Olympics.

=== Pre-event ===
South Korea's Kwak Ye-ji was tipped as the favourite for gold medal, the world number seven entering as the most decorated archer at the Youth Olympics having won gold medal in the final of the 2009 Archery World Cup and silver medal at the 2009 World Archery Championships. At age 17, Mariana Avitia of Mexico became her nation's youngest athlete to compete in two Olympic games, the world number fifteen having competed in the women's individual event at the 2008 Summer Olympics in Beijing.

The withdrawal of a competitor from Brazil before the start of the event led to only thirty-one archers taking part instead of the expected thirty-two. As the Brazilian archer was also set to compete in the mixed team event, which was contested by athletes paired from the girls' and boys' individual events, FITA and the International Olympic Committee granted an additional entry from Singapore to ensure the mixed team event had an even number of entrants. Elizabeth Cheok was selected as the replacement, although she was not permitted to compete in the individual event. The top seed from the ranking round was therefore given a bye to the second elimination round to compensate for the lack of a thirty-second seed.

=== Ranking round ===
The competition began on the morning of 18 August with the 72-arrow ranking round. Kwak was in dominant form, clinching the top seed by a comfortable margin of 22 points over Tan Ya-ting of Chinese Taipei and setting a new junior world record in the process. Her score of 670 – out of a maximum of 720 – beat the existing record set by compatriot Um Hye-rang in 2001 by four points. Choi Seung Sil, the South Korean coach, however reflected that Kwak's achievement was no cause for excitement, commenting that "[i]n practice she will score up to 680, so we don't really care about breaking the record." Behind Tan in second was Russia's Tatiana Segina on 639 points, with Mariana Avitia and India's Seema Verma placing fourth and fifth.

=== Elimination rounds ===
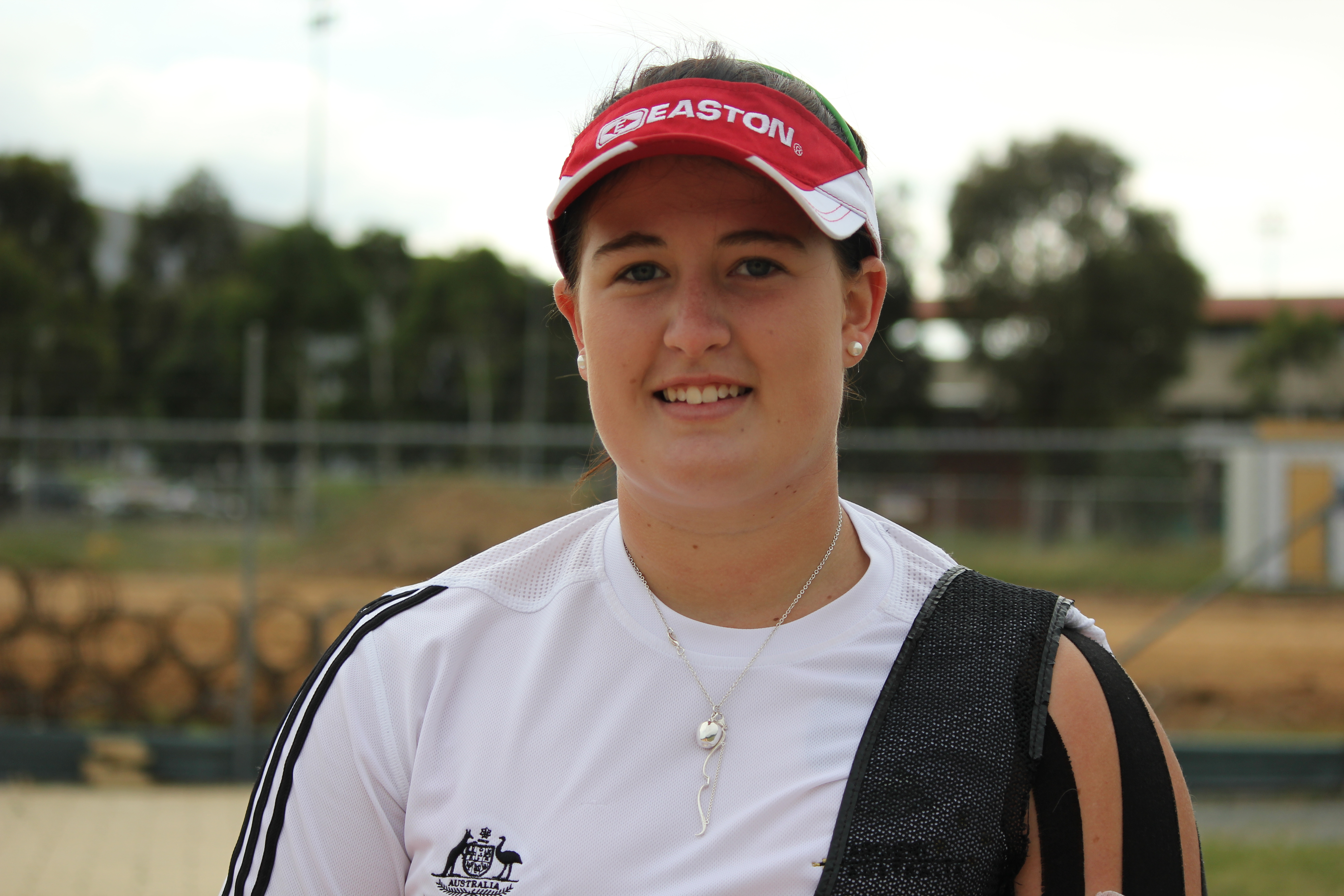
Alice Ingley of Australia (pictured in 2012) was knocked out by Moldova's Alexandra Mîrca in the last sixteen.

The knock-out rounds began on the afternoon of 18 August with the 1/16 elimination rounds. The top eight seeds each advanced to the 1/8 eliminations with ninth-seed Gloria Filippi of Italy the highest ranked archer failing to progress. After a break in play on 19 August, in which the mixed team competition was contested, the girls' individual event resumed for its final day of competition on 20 August, the morning session hosting the 1/8 elimination round. Kwak, Tan, Segina, and Avitia all advanced to the quarter-finals, Tan eliminating the bronze medalist from the mixed team event Turkey's Begünhan Elif Ünsal in the process. The round also saw Moldova's Alexandra Mîrca come back from two sets down to defeat Alice Ingley of Australia — a shot in the third set by the Australian which scored just four points was noted by FITA commentators Vanahé Antille and Didier Mieville as the turning point in the match. The weather intervened with a short rain shower during the fifth match of the morning between Miranda Leek of the United States and Isabel Viehmeier of Germany. The wet conditions appeared to affect Leek's form in particular, the American exiting the competition after failing to score higher than an eight until her eighth arrow of the match, by which time Viehmeier held a four set point lead. The rainfall ceased shortly after the beginning of the following match between China's Song Jia and Ukraine's Lidiia Sichenikova, Song winning by seven set points to three.

The quarter-finals kicked off the final day's afternoon session at 2:30pm, Kwak, Tan, Segina, and Avitia again successfully advancing to reach the semi-finals. The first match between Kwak and Mîrca was a tight affair, Kwak winning the first and third sets and Mîrca winning the second and fourth. The South Korean however clinched the fifth set by one point - thereby avoiding a one-arrow shoot-off - after a judge confirmed in a post-match review that Mîrca's first arrow of the set landed within the 8-ring rather than edging into the 9-ring. In the other quarter-final contests Tan and Segina dispatched Viehmeier and Song respectively in straight sets while Avitia dropped just one set in her victory against Belgium's Zoé Göbbels.

The two semi-final matches were held immediately after the quarter-finals. Kwak and Tan each overcame poor starts to progress to the gold medal final. Kwak lost the first two sets to Avitia, but with the Mexican failing to land an arrow in the central 10 ring for the rest of the match, Kwak prevailed in the next three sets to win by six set points to four. In the second semi-final Tan began with a six on her first arrow, gifting Segina a straightforward victory in the opening set. A perfect score of thirty in the second set however brought Tan back into contention. A narrowly won third set and a score of twenty-nine in the fourth was enough for Tan to win the match secure a spot in the final.

=== Medal matches ===
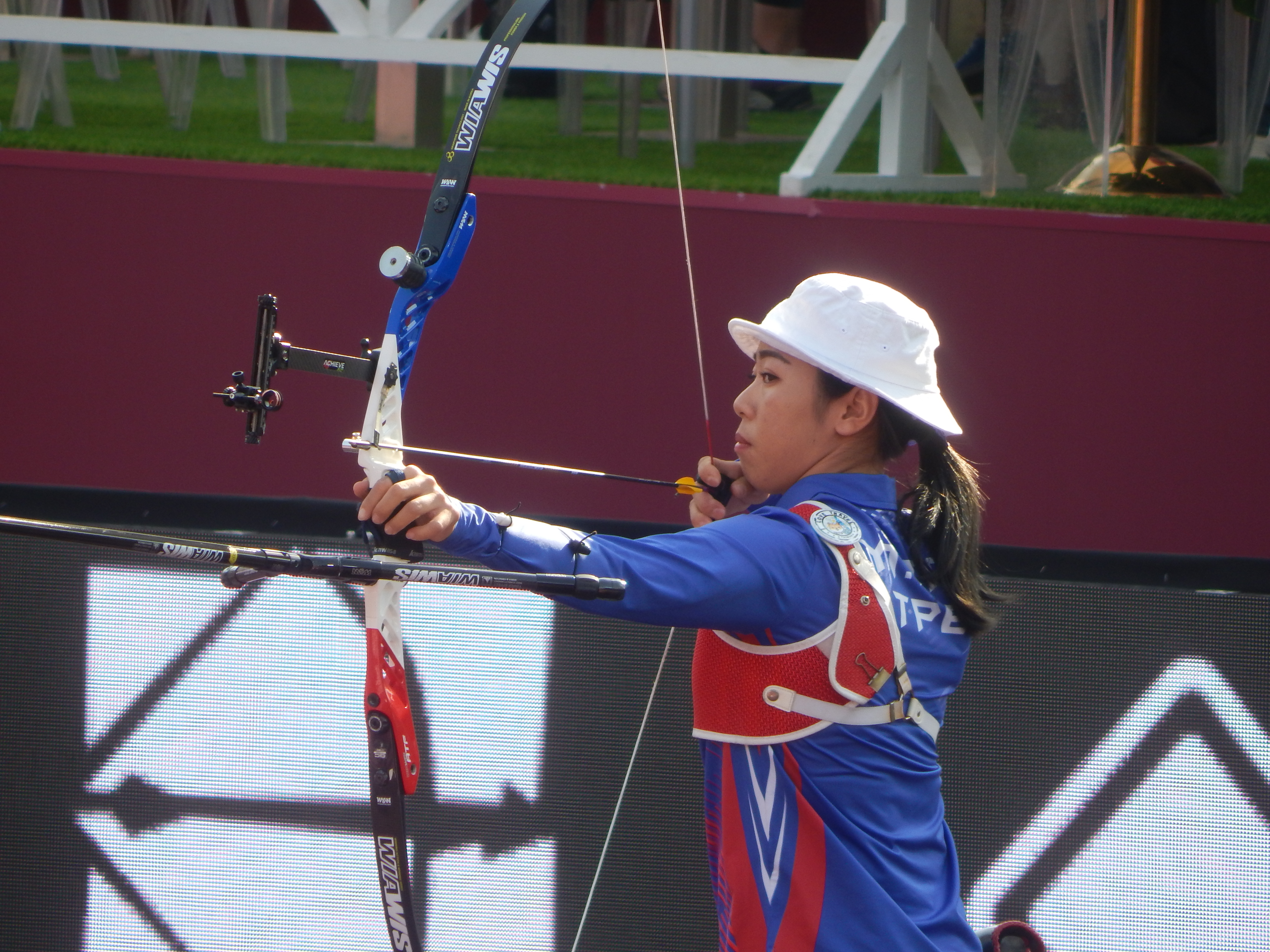
Tan Ya-Ting of Chinese Taipei (pictured in 2019) won silver medal after losing in the final.

As the two losing archers from the semi-finals, Avitia and Segina met to contest the bronze medal final, which followed the semi-final matches at just before 4pm. After three sets Segina held the advantage, and when Avitia faltered with her final arrow in the fourth set, scoring just a seven, Segina shot into the 10 ring resulting in victory and the bronze medal for the Russian. Following the match Avitia said she was satisfied and not disappointed with a fourth-place finish, feeling she had put in a strong performance against Kwak in the semi-finals. She however stated that the quick turnaround between competing at the 2010 Central American and Caribbean Games and the Youth Olympics may have influenced her overall form, having not had sufficient time for rest before arriving in Singapore.

The gold medal final saw Kwak defeat Tan in four sets, posting a total score of 117 in her 12 arrows that would have been a new junior world record under the previous FITA competition format. Kwak's perfect scores of 30 in the first and third sets was met by Tan's own maximum score in the second, but Kwak's total of 29 in the fourth set was too much for Tan, the South Korean taking what the Yonhap News Agency described as a "widely expected" victory. Afterwards Kwak admitted she had felt nervous in the final after her tough semi-final victory over Avitia, but immediately set her sights on replicating her success at the 2012 Summer Olympics, stating her aim was to win two gold medals in London. As runner-up, Tan received the silver medal. The archer from Chinese Taipei said she had enjoyed the experience of the competition but had mixed emotions about the result, commenting that despite being pleased with her silver medal "I feel sorry for my family and friends that I didn't bring the gold medal home".

== Results ==
=== Ranking Round ===
Rank	Archer	Half		Total	10s	Xs
Rank	Archer	1st	2nd	Total	10s	Xs
1	Kwak Ye-ji (KOR)	334	336	670 JWR	34	13
2	Tan Ya-ting (TPE)	319	329	648	22	4
3	Tatiana Segina (RUS)	321	318	639	17	4
4	Mariana Avitia (MEX)	319	318	637	23	4
5	Seema Verma (IND)	311	324	635	21	5
6	Farida Tukebayeva (KAZ)	314	321	635	18	3
7	Lidiia Sichenikova (UKR)	313	314	627	13	3
8	Alexandra Mîrca (MDA)	313	313	626	21	7
9	Gloria Filippi (ITA)	303	320	623	16	5
10	Song Jia (CHN)	301	318	619	11	3
11	Isabel Viehmeier (GER)	289	315	604	15	2
12	Zoé Göbbels (BEL)	294	309	603	10	3
13	Nynne Sophie Holdt-Caspersen (DEN)	303	299	602	13	2
14	Erwina Safitri (INA)	301	300	601	12	5
15	Tze Rong Vanessa Loh (SIN)	297	304	601	8	4
16	Maud Custers (NED)	296	298	594	12	1
17	Laurie Lecointre (FRA)	296	296	592	11	5
18	Begünhan Elif Ünsal (TUR)	289	299	588	11	0
19	Mai Okubo (JPN)	288	295	583	8	2
20	Miriam Alarcón (ESP)	272	309	581	15	4
21	Aleksandra Wojnicka (POL)	281	294	575	5	1
22	Yasaman Shirian (IRI)	276	289	565	6	2
23	Brina Božič (SLO)	292	269	561	9	1
24	Alice Ingley (AUS)	267	293	560	3	1
25	Iryna Hul (BLR)	288	266	554	7	1
26	Zoi Paraskevopoulou (GRE)	256	295	551	7	3
27	Miranda Leek (USA)	284	266	550	10	3
28	Tanja Sorsa (FIN)	243	305	548	10	7
29	Beauty Ray (BAN)	246	270	516	6	4
30	Kristina Zaynutdinova (TJK)	236	258	494	10	4
31	Aya Kamel (EGY)	239	253	492	4	2
32	Elizabeth Cheok (SIN)	0	0	0	0	0

=== Elimination rounds ===
==== Top half ====
1/16 eliminations
1	Kwak Ye-ji (KOR)
32	Elizabeth Cheok (SIN)	DNS
17	Laurie Lecointre (FRA)	0
16	Maud Custers (NED)	6
9	Gloria Filippi (ITA)	4
24	Alice Ingley (AUS)	6
25	Iryna Hul (BLR)	1
8	Alexandra Mîrca (MDA)	7
5	Seema Verma (IND)	6
28	Tanja Sorsa (FIN)	0
21	Aleksandra Wojnicka (POL)	1
12	Zoé Göbbels (BEL)	7
13	Nynne Sophie Holdt-Caspersen (DEN)	2
20	Miriam Alarcón (ESP)	6
29	Beauty Ray (BAN)	0
4	Mariana Avitia (MEX)	6

1/8 eliminations
1	Kwak Ye-ji (KOR)	7
16	Maud Custers (NED)	1
24	Alice Ingley (AUS)	4
8	Alexandra Mîrca (MDA)	6
5	Seema Verma (IND)	3
12	Zoé Göbbels (BEL)	7
20	Miriam Alarcón (ESP)	1
4	Mariana Avitia (MEX)	7

Quarterfinals
1	Kwak Ye-ji (KOR)	6
8	Alexandra Mîrca (MDA)	4
12	Zoé Göbbels (BEL)	2
4	Mariana Avitia (MEX)	6

Semifinals
1	Ye Ji Kwak (KOR)	6
4	Mariana Avitia (MEX)	4

==== Bottom half ====
1/16 eliminations
3	Tatiana Segina (RUS)	6
30	Kristina Zaynutdinova (TJK)	0
19	Mai Okubo (JPN)	6
14	Erwina Safitri (INA)	4
11	Isabel Viehmeier (GER)	6
22	Yasaman Shirian (IRI)	2
27	Miranda Leek (USA)	6
6	Farida Tukebayeva (KAZ)	4
7	Lidiia Sichenikova (UKR)	6
26	Zoi Paraskevopoulou (GRE)	0
23	Brina Božič (SLO)	4
10	Song Jia (CHN)	6
15	Tze Rong Vanessa Loh (SIN)	5
18	Begünhan Elif Ünsal (TUR)	6*
31	Aya Kamel (EGY)	0
2	Tan Ya-ting (TPE)	6

1/8 eliminations
3	Tatiana Segina (RUS)	6
19	Mai Okubo (JPN)	4
11	Isabel Viehmeier (GER)	6
27	Miranda Leek (USA)	2
7	Lidiia Sichenikova (UKR)	3
10	Song Jia (CHN)	7
18	Begünhan Elif Ünsal (TUR)	2
2	Tan Ya-ting (TPE)	6

Quarterfinals
3	Tatiana Segina (RUS)	6
11	Isabel Viehmeier (GER)	0
10	Song Jia (CHN)	0
2	Tan Ya-ting (TPE)	6

Semifinals
3	Tatiana Segina (RUS)	2
2	Tan Ya-ting (TPE)	6

- Note: An asterisk (*) denotes a win from a one-arrow shoot-off

=== Finals ===
Semifinals
1	Kwak Ye-ji (KOR)	6	26	27	28	28	28
4	Mariana Avitia (MEX)	4	28	28	26	26	26
3	Tatiana Segina (RUS)	2	28	27	26	26
2	Tan Ya-ting (TPE)	6	24	30	27	29

Finals
1	Kwak Ye-ji (KOR) (gold)	6	30	28	30	29
2	Tan Ya-ting (TPE) (silver)	2	27	30	27	27
Third place
4	Mariana Avitia (MEX)	2	25	28	27	24
3	Tatiana Segina (RUS) (bronze)	6	29	27	28	27

== See also ==
- Archery at the 2008 Summer Olympics – Women's individual
- Archery at the 2012 Summer Olympics – Women's individual
