= Poland at the 2010 Summer Youth Olympics =

- IOC code: POL
- NOC: Polish Olympic Committee
- Website: www.pkol.pl

in Singapore
- Competitors: 43 in 17 sports
- Flag bearer: Maja Rasinska
- Medals Ranked 45th: Gold 1 Silver 0 Bronze 5 Total 6

Summer Youth Olympics appearances
- 2010; 2014; 2018

Poland participated in the 2010 Summer Youth Olympics in Singapore.

The Polish squad consisted of 43 athletes competing in 17 sports: aquatics (swimming), archery, athletics, boxing, canoeing, cycling, equestrian, fencing, gymnastics, judo, modern pentathlon, rowing, sailing, table tennis, taekwondo, weightlifting and wrestling.

== Medalists ==
Medal	Name	Sport	Event	Date
Gold	Wojciech Dahlke	Equestrian	Team Jumping	20 Aug
Gold	Krzysztof Brzozowski	Athletics	Boys' Shot Put	22 Aug
Silver	Martyna Swatowska	Fencing	Mixed Team	18 Aug
Silver	Tomasz Kluczynski	Athletics	Boys' Medley Relay	23 Aug
Bronze	Martyna Swatowska	Fencing	Girls' épée	17 Aug
Bronze	Marcin Cieslak	Swimming	Boys' 200m Butterfly	20 Aug
Bronze	Aneta Rydz	Athletics	Girls' High Jump	22 Aug
Bronze	Anna Wloka	Athletics	Girls' Shot Put	22 Aug
Bronze	Dawid Michelus	Boxing	Boys' Bantam 54kg	24 Aug

== Archery ==
Boys

Athlete	Event	Ranking Round		Round of 32	Round of 16	Quarterfinals	Semifinals	Final	
Athlete	Event	Score	Seed	Opposition Score	Opposition Score	Opposition Score	Opposition Score	Opposition Score	Rank
Maciej Jaworski	Boys’ Individual	553	29	Tsybzhitov (RUS); L 0-6	Did not advance				17

Girls

Athlete	Event	Ranking Round		Round of 32	Round of 16	Quarterfinals	Semifinals	Final	
Athlete	Event	Score	Seed	Opposition Score	Opposition Score	Opposition Score	Opposition Score	Opposition Score	Rank
Aleksandra Wojnicka	Girls’ Individual	575	21	Gobbels (BEL); L 1-7	Did not advance				17

Mixed Team

Athlete	Event	Partner	Round of 32	Round of 16	Quarterfinals	Semifinals	Final	
Athlete	Event	Partner	Opposition Score	Opposition Score	Opposition Score	Opposition Score	Opposition Score	Rank
Maciej Jaworski	Mixed Team	Tatiana Segina (RUS)	Unsal (TUR)/ Jaffar (SIN); L 4-6	Did not advance				17
Aleksandra Wojnicka	Mixed Team	Yagiz Yilmaz (TUR)	Verma (IND)/ Linster (HUN); W 6-2	Alarcón (ESP)/ Milon (BAN); L 3-7	Did not advance			9

== Athletics ==
=== Boys ===
Track and Road Events

Athletes	Event	Qualification		Final	
Athletes	Event	Result	Rank	Result	Rank
Tomasz Kluczynski	Boys’ 200m	21.80	6 Q	21.56	7
Sebastian Wiszniewski	Boys’ 400m	48.83	13 qB	48.45	12
Filip Drozdowski	Boys’ 110m Hurdles	13.82	5 Q	13.75	6
David Bolarinwa (GBR); Tomasz Kluczynski (POL); Marco Lorenzi (ITA); Nikita Uglov (RUS)	Boys’ Medley Relay			1:52.11	Silver medal

Field Events

Athletes	Event	Qualification		Final	
Athletes	Event	Result	Rank	Result	Rank
Krzysztof Brzozowski	Boys’ Shot Put	22.50	1 Q	23.23	Gold medal
Wojciech Praczyk	Boys’ Discus Throw	55.43	6 Q	57.01	6
Sebastian Dobkowski	Boys’ Hammer Throw	70.13	6 Q	69.54	4
Adrian Jozefowicz	Boys’ Triple Jump	NM qB		DNS	

=== Girls ===
Track and Road Events

Athletes	Event	Qualification		Final	
Athletes	Event	Result	Rank	Result	Rank
Karolina Koleczek	Girls’ 100m Hurdles	DNF qC		DNS	
Katarzyna Dulak	Girls’ 2000m Steeplechase	7:09.75	11 qB	7:00.64	10

Field Events

Athletes	Event	Qualification		Final	
Athletes	Event	Result	Rank	Result	Rank
Anna Wloka	Girls’ Shot Put	15.77	1 Q	15.48	Bronze medal
Sandra Malinowska	Girls’ Hammer Throw	55.30	6 Q	52.69	4
Aneta Rydz	Girls’ High Jump	1.76	1 Q	1.79	Bronze medal

== Boxing ==
Boys

Athlete	Event	Preliminaries	Semifinals	Final	Rank
Dawid Michelus	Bantamweight (54kg)	Alexandru Marin (ROU); W 4-0	Robeisy Eloy Ramirez (CUB); L 1-3	3rd Place Bout; Zack Davies (GBR); W 12-7	Bronze medal

== Canoeing ==
Boys

Athlete	Event	Time Trial		Round 1	Round 2 (Rep)	Round 3	Round 4	Round 5	Final
Athlete	Event	Time	Rank	Round 1	Round 2 (Rep)	Round 3	Round 4	Round 5	Final
Patryk Sokol	Boys’ C1 Slalom	1:56.89	6	Burisa (CRO); W 1:54.90-1:55.34		Kutsev (AZE); L 1:56.59-1:53.53	Soeter (GER); L 1:56.92-1:40.23	Did not advance	
Patryk Sokol	Boys’ C1 Sprint	1:45.06	5	Chimbumba (ANG); L DSQ-2:10.12	Did not advance				
Igor Dolata	Boys’ K1 Slalom	2:02.45	21	Bernis (FRA); L 2:03.80-1:30.89	Jimenez (CUB); L 1:53.42-1:46.40	Did not advance			
Igor Dolata	Boys’ K1 Sprint	1:34.36	13	Nedyalkov (BUL); W 1:32.45-1:33.31		Brus (SLO); W 1:33.14-1:34.57	Tsarykovich (BLR); L 1:35.55-1:32.46	Did not advance	

Girls

Athlete	Event	Time Trial		Round 1	Round 2 (Rep)	Round 3	Round 4	Round 5	Final
Athlete	Event	Time	Rank	Round 1	Round 2 (Rep)	Round 3	Round 4	Round 5	Final
Joanna Bruska	Girls’ K1 Slalom	1:59.92	18	Hostens (FRA); L 2:05.31-1:41.33	Farkasdi (HUN); W 1:53.93-2:00.08	Wolffhardt (AUT); L 2:02.09-1:38.89	Did not advance		
Joanna Bruska	Girls’ K1 Sprint	1:43.43	5	Barrera (ARG); W 1:43.12-1:59.02		Wang (SIN); W 1:43.21-1:53.13	Peters (HUN); L 1:44.58-1:44.52	Did not advance	

== Cycling ==
Cross Country

Athlete	Event	Time	Rank	Points
Bartlomiej Wawak	Boys’ Cross Country	1:00:13	4	25
Monika Zur	Girls’ Cross Country	51:23	6	18

Time Trial

Athlete	Event	Time	Rank	Points
Marek Kulas	Boys’ Time Trial	4:09.61	10	22
Monika Zur	Girls’ Time Trial	DNS		40

BMX

Athlete	Event	Seeding Round		Quarterfinals							Semifinals							Final		
Athlete	Event	Seeding Round		Run 1		Run 2		Run 3		Rank	Run 1		Run 2		Run 3		Rank	Final		
Athlete	Event	Time	Rank	Time	Rank	Time	Rank	Time	Rank	Rank	Time	Rank	Time	Rank	Time	Rank	Rank	Time	Rank	Points
Michal Czerkies	Boys’ BMX	44.393	25	44.317	7	46.229	7	44.281	7	7	Did not advance									72
Monika Zur	Girls’ BMX	1:09.123	31	DNS	8	DNS	8	DSQ		DSQ	Did not advance									40

Road Race

Athlete	Event	Time	Rank	Points
Marek Kulas	Boys’ Road Race	1:05:44	25	67*
Bartlomiej Wawak	Boys’ Road Race	1:05:44	30	
Michal Czerkies	Boys’ Road Race	1:16:48	70	

Overall

Team	Event	Cross Country Pts		Time Trial Pts		BMX Pts		Road Race Pts	Total	Rank
Team	Event	Boys	Girls	Boys	Girls	Boys	Girls	Road Race Pts	Total	Rank
Monika Zur; Bartlomiej Wawak; Marek Kulas; Michal Czerkies	Mixed Team	25	18	22	40	72	40	67*	284	12

- * Received -5 for finishing road race with all three racers

== Equestrian ==
Athlete	Horse	Event	Round 1			Round 2			Total	Jump-Off		Rank
Athlete	Horse	Event	Penalties		Rank	Penalties		Rank	Total	Penalties	Time	Rank
Athlete	Horse	Event	Jump	Time	Rank	Jump	Time	Rank	Total	Penalties	Time	Rank
Wojciech Dahlke	Travelling Soldior	Individual Jumping	0	0	1	4	0	8	4	4	40.03	6
Martin Fuchs (SUI); Wojciech Dahlke (POL); Valentina Isoardi (ITA); Carian Scudamore (GBR); Nicola Philippaerts (BEL)	Midnight Mist; Travelling Soldior; Alloria Thomas; Might Mcgyver; Gippsland Girl	Team Jumping	0; ~~12~~; ~~28~~; 0; 4	0; ~~0~~; ~~0~~; 0; 0	1	0; 4; ~~16~~; 0; ~~4~~	0; 0; ~~0~~; 0; ~~0~~	2	8	0; 0; ~~24~~; 4; ~~DNS~~	45.30; 49.19; ~~54.92~~; 46.54; ~~DNS~~	Gold medal

== Fencing ==
Group Stage

Athlete	Event	Match 1	Match 2	Match 3	Match 4	Match 5	Match 6	Seed
Tomasz Kruk	Boys’ Épée	Svichkar (UKR); W 5-2	Zhakupov (KAZ); W 5-3	Fichera (ITA); L 3-5	Melaragno (BRA); W 5-4	Saleh (EGY); L 3-5		7
Martyna Swatowska	Girls’ Épée	Rahardja (SIN); W 5-2	Jaqman (PLE); W 5-1	Holmes (USA); L 3-4	Lin (CHN); L 4-5	Santuccio (ITA); W 5-4	Brunner (SUI); W 5-3	4
Angelika Wator	Girls’ Sabre	Merza (USA); L 1-5	Wan (CHN); L 4-5	Nyabileke (COD); W 5-0	Musch (GER); L 3-5	Hilwiyah (IRQ); W 5-0	Komaschuk (UKR); L 3-5	10

Knock-Out Stage

Athlete	Event	Round of 16	Quarterfinals	Semifinals	Final	Rank
Tomasz Kruk	Boys’ Épée	Melaragno (BRA); W 15-13	Bodoczi (GER); L 10-15	Did not advance		6
Martyna Swatowska	Girls’ Épée	Jaqman (PLE); W 15-4	Lee (KOR); W 15-14	Lin (CHN); L 11-15	Holmes (USA); W 15-9	Bronze medal
Angelika Wator	Girls’ Sabre	Boudad (FRA); L 13-15	Did not advance			10
Europe 2 Anja Musch (GER); Nikolaus Bodoczi (GER); Victoria Alekseeva (RUS); Richard Hubers (GER); Martyna Swatowska (POL); Tevfik Burak Babaoglu (TUR)	Mixed Team		Asia-Oceania 2 W 30-21	Asia-Oceania 1 W 30-27	Europe 1 L 24-30	Silver medal
Europe 3 Alina Komaschuk (UKR); Tomasz Kruk (POL); Dora Lupkovics (HUN); Mikhail Akula (BLR); Yulia Bakhareva (RUS); Kirill Lichagin (RUS)	Mixed Team		Americas 1 L 28-30	5th-8th Americas 2 W 30-23	5th-6th Europe 4 L 29-30	6

== Gymnastics ==
=== Artistic Gymnastics ===
Boys

Athlete	Event	Floor		Pommel Horse		Rings		Vault		Parallel Bars		Horizontal Bar		Total	
Athlete	Event	Score	Rank	Score	Rank	Score	Rank	Score	Rank	Score	Rank	Score	Rank	Score	Rank
Lukasz Borkowski	Boys' Qualification	0.000	41	11.050	37	0.000	41	13.900	40	0.000	41	10.800	40	35.750	41

== Judo ==
Individual

Athlete	Event	Round 1	Round 2	Round 3	Semifinals	Final	Rank
Athlete	Event	Opposition Result	Opposition Result	Opposition Result	Opposition Result	Opposition Result	Rank
Maja Rasinska	Girls' -52 kg	Rosso-Richetto (FRA); L 000-100	Repechage; Pop (ROU); W 021-000		Repechage; Rosso-Richetto (FRA); W 100-000	Bronze Medal Match; Ri (PRK); L 000-100	5

Team

Team	Event	Round 1	Round 2	Semifinals	Final	Rank
Team	Event	Opposition Result	Opposition Result	Opposition Result	Opposition Result	Rank
Paris; Barbara Batizi (HUN); Patrick Marxer (LIE); Maja Rasinska (POL); Farshid Ghasemi Asl (IRI); Sophina Arrey (CMR); Khasan Khalmurzaev (RUS); Sana Khelifi (ALG); Fernando Vanoye (MEX)	Mixed Team	Tokyo; L 3-5	Did not advance			9

== Modern pentathlon ==
Athlete	Event	Fencing (Épée One Touch)			Swimming (200m Freestyle)			Running & Shooting (3000m, Laser Pistol)			Total Points	Final Rank
Athlete	Event	Results	Rank	Points	Time	Rank	Points	Time	Rank	Points	Total Points	Final Rank
Karol Dziudziek	Boys' Individual	15-8	4	960	2:13.07	15	1204	11:34.22	12	2224	4388	7
Anna Maliszewska	Girls' Individual	15-8	5	960	2:25.95	13	1056	12:45.10	7	1940	3956	5
Franziska Hanko (GER); Karol Dziudziek (POL)	Mixed Relay	44-48	15	800	2:09.59	20	1248	15:41.42	8	2316	4364	=11
Anna Maliszewska (POL); Todd Renfree (AUS)	Mixed Relay	50-42	6	860	2:11.65	22	1224	15:50.67	11	2280	4364	=11

== Rowing ==
Athlete	Event	Heats		Repechage		Semifinals		Final		Overall Rank
Athlete	Event	Time	Rank	Time	Rank	Time	Rank	Time	Rank	Overall Rank
Konrad Raczynski	Boys' Single Sculls	3:27.33	4 QR	3:42.72	4 QC/D	3:45.04	2 QC	3:42.40	5	16

== Sailing ==
One Person Dinghy

Athlete	Event	Race												Points	Rank
Athlete	Event	1	2	3	4	5	6	7	8	9	10	11	M*	Points	Rank
Sara Piasecka	Girls' Byte CII	~~DSQ~~	4	13	8	11	8	7	17	~~18~~	6	16	16	106	12

Windsurfing

Athlete	Event	Race											Points	Rank
Athlete	Event	1	2	3	4	5	6	7	8	9	10	M*	Points	Rank
Robert Pellowski	Boys' Techno 293	~~15~~	10	13	13	11	13	14	10	10	13	11	118	11
Hanna Idziak	Girls' Techno 293	7	7	6	5	9	3	~~10~~	10	7	7	6	67	8

== Swimming ==
Athletes	Event	Heat		Semifinal		Final	
Athletes	Event	Time	Position	Time	Position	Time	Position
Matuesz Wysoczynski	Boys’ 50m Backstroke			26.80	7 Q	26.96	7
Matuesz Wysoczynski	Boys’ 100m Backstroke	58.00	12 Q	57.56	10	Did not advance	
Matuesz Wysoczynski	Boys’ 200m Backstroke	2:04.80	5 Q			2:05.01	8
Marcin Cieślak	Boys’ 100m Butterfly	54.64	4 Q	54.30	7 Q	53.78	4
Marcin Cieślak	Boys’ 200m Butterfly	2:01.69	3 Q			1:57.68	Bronze medal
Natalia Pawlaczek	Girls’ 50m Freestyle	27.42	23	Did not advance			
Natalia Pawlaczek	Girls’ 100m Freestyle	58.29	15 Q	58.40	16	Did not advance	
Natalia Pawlaczek	Girls’ 200m Freestyle	2:05.76	15			Did not advance	
Klaudia Nazieblo	Girls’ 50m Backstroke	30.07	6 Q	29.91	5 Q	29.57	4
Klaudia Nazieblo	Girls’ 100m Backstroke	1:04.57	9 Q	1:03.57	5 Q	1:03.07	4
Klaudia Nazieblo	Girls’ 200m Backstroke	2:16.54	7 Q			2:16.45	7

== Table tennis ==
Individual

Athlete	Event	Round 1		Round 2		Quarterfinals	Semifinals	Final	Rank
Athlete	Event	Group Matches	Rank	Group Matches	Rank	Quarterfinals	Semifinals	Final	Rank
Konrad Kulpa	Boys' Singles	Niwa (JPN); L 0-3 (6-11, 4-11, 7-11)	2 Q	Gauzy (FRA); L 0-3 (12-14, 8-11, 11-13)	4	Did not advance			13
Konrad Kulpa	Boys' Singles	Mejía (ESA); W 3-0 (11-2, 12-10, 11-4)	2 Q	Fucec (CRO); L 2-3 (11-6, 11-2, 9-11, 8-11, 11-13)	4	Did not advance			13
Konrad Kulpa	Boys' Singles	Wagner (GER); W 3-0 (11-5, 11-7, RET)	2 Q	Chiu (HKG); L 2-3 (12-10, 4-11, 11-4, 2-11, 7-11)	4	Did not advance			13

Team

Athlete	Event	Round 1		Round 2	Quarterfinals	Semifinals	Final	Rank
Athlete	Event	Group Matches	Rank	Round 2	Quarterfinals	Semifinals	Final	Rank
Europe 4 Olga Bliznet (MDA); Konrad Kulpa (POL)	Mixed Team	Europe 1 Szocs (ROU); Soderlund (SWE); L 1-2 (0-3, 3-1, 1-3)	2 Q	Singapore; Li (SIN); Chew (SIN); L 0-2 (0-3, 1-3)	Did not advance			9
Europe 4 Olga Bliznet (MDA); Konrad Kulpa (POL)	Mixed Team	Africa 2 Ivoso (CGO); Kam (MRI); W 3-0 (3-0, 3-0, 3-0)	2 Q	Singapore; Li (SIN); Chew (SIN); L 0-2 (0-3, 1-3)	Did not advance			9
Europe 4 Olga Bliznet (MDA); Konrad Kulpa (POL)	Mixed Team	Europe 3 Loveridge (GBR); Mutti (ITA); W 2-1 (3-0, 0-3, 3-1)	2 Q	Singapore; Li (SIN); Chew (SIN); L 0-2 (0-3, 1-3)	Did not advance			9

== Taekwondo ==
Athlete	Event	Preliminary	Quarterfinal	Semifinal	Final	Rank
Marcin Anikiej	Boys' -63kg	BYE	Berk Sungu (TUR); L 7-10	Did not advance		5

== Weightlifting ==
Athlete	Event	Snatch	Clean & Jerk	Total	Rank
Patryk Slowikowski	Boys' 62kg	100	123	223	8
Milena Kruczynska	Girls' +63kg	82	106	188	9

== Wrestling ==
Freestyle

Athlete	Event	Pools		Final	Rank
Athlete	Event	Groups	Rank	Final	Rank
Suzan Saeed Ali	Girls' 70kg	Mohamed (EGY); W 2–0 (1–0, 3–1)	3	5th Place Match; Kuenz (AUT); L 0–2 (0–3, 0–3)	6
Suzan Saeed Ali	Girls' 70kg	Kushkenova (KAZ); L Fall (1–5, 2–0, 0-5)	3	5th Place Match; Kuenz (AUT); L 0–2 (0–3, 0–3)	6
Suzan Saeed Ali	Girls' 70kg	Moon (KOR); L 1–2 (1–4, 1–0, 1-3)	3	5th Place Match; Kuenz (AUT); L 0–2 (0–3, 0–3)	6
