= Spain at the 2010 Summer Youth Olympics =

- IOC code: ESP
- NOC: Spanish Olympic Committee
- Website: www.coe.es

in Singapore
- Competitors: 46 in 15 sports
- Flag bearer: Judit Ignacio
- Medals Ranked 33rd: Gold 1 Silver 4 Bronze 6 Total 11

Summer Youth Olympics appearances (overview)
- 2010; 2014; 2018; 2026

Spain participated in the 2010 Summer Youth Olympics in Singapore.

The Spanish team included 46 athletes competing in 15 sports.

== Medalists ==
Medal	Name	Sport	Event	Date
Gold	Dídac Salas	Athletics	Boys' pole vault	23 Aug
Gold	Pedro Rivadulla	Judo	Mixed Team	25 Aug
Silver	Judit Ignacio	Swimming	Girls' 200m Butterfly	16 Aug
Silver	Judit Ignacio	Swimming	Girls' 100m Butterfly	20 Aug
Silver	Maria Vargas	Gymnastics	Girls' Vault	21 Aug
Silver	Nesto Abad	Gymnastics	Boys' Horizontal Bar	22 Aug
Bronze	Aitor Martinez	Swimming	Boys' 50m Freestyle	17 Aug
Bronze	Nagore Irigoien	Taekwondo	Girls' 63kg	18 Aug
Bronze	Nesto Abad	Gymnastics	Boys' Rings	21 Aug
Bronze	Pedro Rivadulla	Judo	Boys' 55kg	21 Aug
Bronze	Inigo Garcia	Canoeing	K1 Sprint Boys	22 Aug
Bronze	Nesto Abad	Gymnastics	Boys' Vault	22 Aug

== Archery ==
Boys

Athlete	Event	Ranking Round		Round of 32	Round of 16	Quarterfinals	Semifinals	Final	
Athlete	Event	Score	Seed	Opposition Score	Opposition Score	Opposition Score	Opposition Score	Opposition Score	Rank
Carlos Rivas	Boys’ Individual	611	17	Shahnazaryan (ARM); W 7-1	Oever (NED); L 0-6	Did not advance			9

Girls

Athlete	Event	Ranking Round		Round of 32	Round of 16	Quarterfinals	Semifinals	Final	
Athlete	Event	Score	Seed	Opposition Score	Opposition Score	Opposition Score	Opposition Score	Opposition Score	Rank
Miriam Alarcón	Girls’ Individual	581	20	Caspersen (DEN); W 6-2	Avitia (MEX); L 1-7	Did not advance			9

Mixed Team

Athlete	Event	Round of 32	Round of 16	Quarterfinals	Semifinals	Final	
Athlete	Event	Opposition Score	Opposition Score	Opposition Score	Opposition Score	Opposition Score	Rank
Carlos Rivas (ESP); Tze Rong Vanessa Loh (SIN)	Mixed Team	Zaynutdinova (TJK)/ Park (KOR); W 7-3	Bozic (SLO)/ Nott (AUS); L 4-6	Did not advance			9
Miriam Alarcón (ESP); Emdadul Milon (BAN)	Mixed Team	Ray (BAN)/ Nesbitt (GBR); W 6-4	Wojnicka (POL)/ Yilmaz (TUR); W 7-3	Ingley (AUS)/ Koiwa (JPN); W 6-5	Paraskevopoulou (GRE)/ Rajh (SLO); L 1-7	Bronze Medal Match; Unsal (TUR)/ Jaffar (SIN); L 5-6	4

== Athletics ==
=== Boys ===
Track and Road Events

Athletes	Event	Qualification		Final	
Athletes	Event	Result	Rank	Result	Rank
Enrique González	Boys’ 400m Hurdles	53.14	8 Q	52.35	5
David Morcillo	Boys’ 2000m Steeplechase	6:10.90	9 qB	5:57.52	11
Alvaro Martin	Boys’ 10km Walk			47:04.10	9

Field Events

Athletes	Event	Qualification		Final	
Athletes	Event	Result	Rank	Result	Rank
Alejandro Noguera	Boys’ Shot Put	17.38	15 qB	18.40	11
Didac Salas	Boys’ Pole Vault	4.70	2 Q	5.05	Gold medal

=== Girls ===
Field Events

Athletes	Event	Qualification		Final	
Athletes	Event	Result	Rank	Result	Rank
Jennifer Nevado	Girls’ Hammer Throw	48.65	14 qB	48.43	13
Ana Martín-Sacristan	Girls’ Long Jump	5.51	13 qB	5.56	12
Ariadna Ramos	Girls’ Triple Jump	12.13	8 Q	12.43	6
Priscilla Shlegel	Girls’ High Jump	1.73	10 qB	1.72	12
Laura Izquierdo	Girls’ Pole Vault	3.50	11 qB	3.45	10

== Badminton ==
Girls

Athlete	Event	Group Stage				Knock-Out Stage			
Athlete	Event	Match 1	Match 2	Match 3	Rank	Quarterfinal	Semifinal	Final	Rank
Carolina Marín	Singles	Pilven (AUS); W 2-0; 21-8 21-9	Mikkela (FIN); W 2-0; 21-8 21-11	Volkanovska (MKD); W 2-0; 21-5, 21-10	1 Q	Deng (CHN); L 0-2; 12-21, 19-21	Did not advance		=5

== Basketball ==
Boys

Squad List	Event	Group Stage		Placement Stage			Rank
Squad List	Event	Group D	Rank	1st-8th	5th-8th	7th-8th	Rank
Lluis Costa; Mikel Motos (C); Javier Medori; Francesc Pascual	Boys' Basketball	Croatia; L 27-29	2	United States; L 18-28	Lithuania; L 14-34	Argentina; L 13-23	8
Lluis Costa; Mikel Motos (C); Javier Medori; Francesc Pascual	Boys' Basketball	South Africa; W 33-5	2	United States; L 18-28	Lithuania; L 14-34	Argentina; L 13-23	8
Lluis Costa; Mikel Motos (C); Javier Medori; Francesc Pascual	Boys' Basketball	Philippines; W 27-25	2	United States; L 18-28	Lithuania; L 14-34	Argentina; L 13-23	8
Lluis Costa; Mikel Motos (C); Javier Medori; Francesc Pascual	Boys' Basketball	Virgin Islands; W 17-11	2	United States; L 18-28	Lithuania; L 14-34	Argentina; L 13-23	8

== Canoeing ==
Boys

Athlete	Event	Time Trial		Round 1	Round 2 (Rep)	Round 3	Round 4	Round 5	Final	Rank
Athlete	Event	Time	Rank	Round 1	Round 2 (Rep)	Round 3	Round 4	Round 5	Final	Rank
Inigo Garcia	Boys’ K1 Slalom	1:39.03	9	Stowman (RSA); W 1:38.08-1:54.67		Zelnychnko (UKR); L 1:43.32-1:36.90	Did not advance			
Inigo Garcia	Boys’ K1 Sprint	1:33.19	6	Silva (STP); W 1:33.27-1:42.15		Smith (AUS); W 1:32.70-1:34.31	Kalashnikov (RUS); W 1:32.42-1:32.87	Totka (HUN); L 1:36.88-1:31.17	Tsarykovich (BLR); W 1:32.47-1:32.60	Bronze medal

Girls

Athlete	Event	Time Trial		Round 1	Round 2 (Rep)	Round 3	Round 4	Round 5	Final	Rank
Athlete	Event	Time	Rank	Round 1	Round 2 (Rep)	Round 3	Round 4	Round 5	Final	Rank
Maria Elena Monleon	Girls’ K1 Slalom	1:58.49	15	Afef (TUN); L 2:00.27-1:51.48	Rimi (MAR); W 1:57.60-2:05.77	Did not advance				
Maria Elena Monleon	Girls’ K1 Sprint	1:44.69	7	Hostens (FRA); W 1:44.69-1:49.59		Villumsen (DEN); W 1:45.95-1:48.40	Podolskaya (RUS); W 1:46.35-DNF	Huang (CHN); L 1:50.50-1:43.78	Peters (BEL); L 1:49.11-1:46.76	4

== Cycling ==
Cross Country

Athlete	Event	Time	Rank	Points
Antonio Santos	Boys’ Cross Country	1:02:22	10	54
Bianca Martin	Girls’ Cross Country	-1LAP	21	40

Time Trial

Athlete	Event	Time	Rank	Points
Alvaro Trueba	Boys’ Time Trial	4:15.25	16	29
Bianca Martin	Girls’ Time Trial	3:37.11	13	36

BMX

Athlete	Event	Seeding Round		Quarterfinals							Semifinals							Final		
Athlete	Event	Seeding Round		Run 1		Run 2		Run 3		Rank	Run 1		Run 2		Run 3		Rank	Final		
Athlete	Event	Time	Rank	Time	Rank	Time	Rank	Time	Rank	Rank	Time	Rank	Time	Rank	Time	Rank	Rank	Time	Rank	Points
Ruben Crespo	Boys’ BMX	33.491	14	34.139	4	33.292	4	33.114	3	3 Q	DNF	8	DNS	8	DNS	8	DSQ	Did not advance		70
Bianca Martin	Girls’ BMX	52.434	23	51.063	7	52.723	7	52.142	7	7	Did not advance									40

Road Race

Athlete	Event	Time	Rank	Points
Antonio Santos	Boys’ Road Race	1:05:44	10	54
Alvaro Trueba	Boys’ Road Race	1:05:44	32	
Ruben Crespo	Boys’ Road Race	DNS		

Overall

Team	Event	Cross Country Pts		Time Trial Pts		BMX Pts		Road Race Pts	Total	Rank
Team	Event	Boys	Girls	Boys	Girls	Boys	Girls	Road Race Pts	Total	Rank
Bianco Martin; Antonio Santos; Alvaro Trueba; Ruben Crespo	Mixed Team	54	40	29	36	70	40	54	323	22

== Gymnastics ==
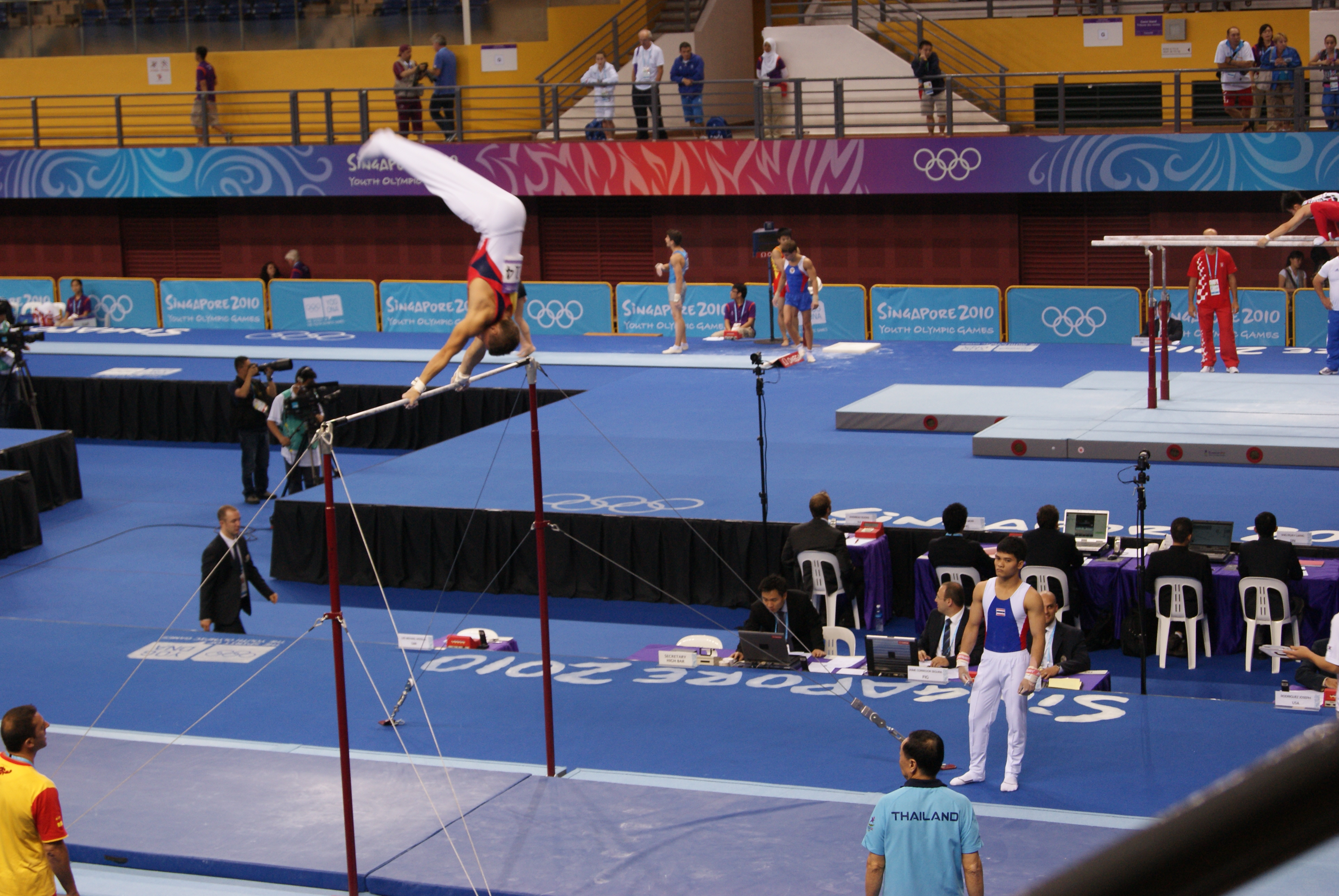
Néstor Abad on the horizontal bar at Bishan Sports Hall on 16 August 2010

=== Artistic Gymnastics ===
Boys

Athlete	Event	Floor		Pommel Horse		Rings		Vault		Parallel Bars		Horizontal Bar		Total	
Athlete	Event	Score	Rank	Score	Rank	Score	Rank	Score	Rank	Score	Rank	Score	Rank	Score	Rank
Néstor Abad	Boys' Qualification	14.100	6 Q	10.200	39	14.050	6 Q	15.800	2 Q	11.500	37	14.100	4 Q	79.750	28

Athlete	Event	Score	Rank
Néstor Abad	Boys' Floor	13.550	7
Néstor Abad	Boys' Rings	14.150	Bronze medal
Néstor Abad	Boys' Vault	15.450	Bronze medal
Néstor Abad	Boys' Horizontal Bar	14.125	Silver medal

Girls

Athlete	Event	Vault		Uneven Bars		Beam		Floor		Total	
Athlete	Event	Score	Rank	Score	Rank	Score	Rank	Score	Rank	Score	Rank
Maria Vargas	Girls' Qualification	13.750	6 Q	12.150	20	12.150	31	12.600	17	50.650	17 Q
Maria Vargas	Girls' Individual All-Around	14.250	3	12.800	9	13.150	11	12.650	13	52.850	9

Athlete	Event	Score	Rank
Maria Vargas	Girls' Vault	13.800	Silver medal

=== Rhythmic Gymnastics ===
Individual

Athlete	Event	Qualification						Final					
Athlete	Event	Rope	Hoop	Ball	Clubs	Total	Rank	Rope	Hoop	Ball	Clubs	Total	Rank
Eugenya Onopko	Girls' Individual All-Around	21.375	23.000	21.900	21.675	87.950	10	Did not advance					

== Judo ==
Individual

Athlete	Event	Round 1	Round 2	Round 3	Semifinals	Final	Rank
Athlete	Event	Opposition Result	Opposition Result	Opposition Result	Opposition Result	Opposition Result	Rank
Pedro Rivadulla	Boys' -55 kg	BYE	Anter (YEM); W 100-000		Pulkrabek (CZE); L 001-011	Bronze Medal Match; Takidine (COM); W 100-000	

Team

Team	Event	Round 1	Round 2	Semifinals	Final	Rank
Team	Event	Opposition Result	Opposition Result	Opposition Result	Opposition Result	Rank
Essen; Lesly Cano (PER); Pedro Rivadulla (ESP); Andrea Krisandova (SVK); Kairat Agibayev (KAZ); Daryl Lokuku Ngambomo (COD); Miku Tashiro (JPN); Alex Maxell Garcia Mendoza (CUB)	Mixed Team	Munich; W 4-3	Chiba; W 5-2	Cairo; W 5-2	Belgrade; W 6-1	Gold medal

== Modern pentathlon ==
Athlete	Event	Fencing (Épée One Touch)			Swimming (200m Freestyle)			Running & Shooting (3000m, Laser Pistol)			Total Points	Final Rank
Athlete	Event	Results	Rank	Points	Time	Rank	Points	Time	Rank	Points	Total Points	Final Rank
Aleix Heredia	Boys' Individual	14-9	5	920	2:17.41	20	1152	10:51.00	3	2396	4468	5
Nuria Chavarria	Girls' Individual	17-6	1	1040	2:35.11	23	940	14:07.58	20	1612	3592	14
Dilyara Ilyassova (KAZ); Aleix Heredia (ESP)	Mixed Relay	56-36	2	920	2:20.06	24	1120	16:57.64	20	2012	4052	21
Nuria Chavarria (ESP); Jorge David Imeri Cabrera (GUA)	Mixed Relay	54-38	5	900	2:13.18	23	1204	17:00.81	21	2000	4104	20

== Rowing ==
Athlete	Event	Heats		Repechage		Semifinals		Final		Overall Rank
Athlete	Event	Time	Rank	Time	Rank	Time	Rank	Time	Rank	Overall Rank
Asier Alonso; Ander Zabala	Boys' Pair	3:16.49	3 QA/B			3:27.59	6 QB	3:20.08	6	12
Garazi Bilbao	Girls' Single Sculls	3:59.72	3 QR	4:06.04	2 QA/B	4:06.11	6 QB	4:00.94	4	10

== Sailing ==
One Person Dinghy

Athlete	Event	Race												Points	Rank
Athlete	Event	1	2	3	4	5	6	7	8	9	10	11	M*	Points	Rank
Marti Llena	Boys' Byte CII	7	17	1	15	6	7	17	2	~~21~~	6	~~19~~	9	87	8

Windsurfing

Athlete	Event	Race											Points	Rank
Athlete	Event	1	2	3	4	5	6	7	8	9	10	M*	Points	Rank
Lara Lagoa	Girls' Techno 293	6	5	~~10~~	2	8	4	4	7	3	2	5	46	4

== Swimming ==
Boys

Athletes	Event	Heat		Semifinal		Final	
Athletes	Event	Time	Position	Time	Position	Time	Position
Aitor Martínez	Boys’ 50m Freestyle	23.13	3 Q	22.92	3 Q	23.83	Bronze medal
Aitor Martínez	Boys’ 100m Freestyle	51.84	14 Q	51.46	9	Did not advance	
Yeray Lebon	Boys’ 100m Freestyle	52.00	18	Did not advance			
Yeray Lebon	Boys’ 200m Freestyle	1:53.53	16			Did not advance	
Adrian Mantas	Boys’ 200m Freestyle	DNS				Did not advance	
Eduardo Solaeche	Boys’ 200m Breaststroke	2:20.80	12			Did not advance	
Eduardo Solaeche	Boys’ 200m Individual Medley	2:04.06	6 Q			2:04.09	6

Girls

Athletes	Event	Heat		Semifinal		Final	
Athletes	Event	Time	Position	Time	Position	Time	Position
Claudia Dasca	Girls’ 200m Freestyle	2:04.54	10			Did not advance	
Claudia Dasca	Girls’ 400m Freestyle	4:18.02	3 Q			4:14.81	5
Teresa Gutierrez	Girls’ 100m Breaststroke	1:12.75	10 Q	1:13.15	15	Did not advance	
Teresa Gutierrez	Girls’ 200m Breaststroke	2:32.42	5 Q			2:31.06	5
Anna Marti	Girls’ 50m Butterfly	28.26	10 Q	28.25	10	Did not advance	
Anna Marti	Girls’ 100m Butterfly	1:02.12	13 Q	1:01.41	8 Q	1:01.38	7
Judit Ignacio	Girls’ 100m Butterfly	1:00.93	2 Q	1:00.87	3 Q	1:00.07	Silver medal
Judit Ignacio	Girls’ 200m Butterfly	2:12.59	2 Q			2:10.11	Silver medal

Mixed

Athletes	Event	Heat		Semifinal		Final	
Athletes	Event	Time	Position	Time	Position	Time	Position
Yeray Lebon; Judit Ignacio; Eduardo Solaeche; Anna Marti	Mixed 4 × 100 m Freestyle Relay	DSQ				Did not advance	
Adrian Mantas; Judit Ignacio; Teresa Gutierrez; Aitor Martínez	Mixed 4 × 100 m Medley Relay	4:07.05	10			Did not advance	

== Taekwondo ==
Athlete	Event	Preliminary	Quarterfinal	Semifinal	Final	Rank
Nagore Irigoien	Girls' -63kg	BYE	Ana Perez (MEX); W 5-4	Soo Yeon Jeon (KOR); L 2-2+	Did not advance	Bronze medal

== Triathlon ==
Girls

Athlete	Event	Swim (.75 km)	Trans 1	Bike (20 km)	Trans 2	Run (5 km)	Total	Rank
Anna Godoy	Individual	9:34	0:35	32:10	0:25	20:45	1:03:29.90	11

Boys

Athlete	Event	Swim (1.5 km)	Trans 1	Bike (40 km)	Trans 2	Run (10 km)	Total	Rank
Diego Paz	Individual	9:20	0:32	29:24	0:25	18:10	57:51.69	20

Mixed

Athlete	Event	Total Times per Athlete (Swim 250 m, Bike 7 km, Run 1.7 km)	Total Group Time	Rank
Charlotte Deldaele (BEL); Andriy Sirenko (UKR); Raquel Mafra Rocha (POR); Diego Paz (ESP)	Mixed Team Relay; Europe 5	20:48; 19:26; 23:05; 20:30	1:23:49.96	10
Monika Oražem (SLO); Gabor Hanko (HUN); Anna Godoy (ESP); Tobias Klesen (GER)	Mixed Team Relay; Europe 3	21:05; 19:29; 22:14; 20:01	1:22:49.66	6

== Weightlifting ==
Girls

Athlete	Event	Snatch	Clean & Jerk	Total	Rank
Atenery Hernández	Girls' 48kg	63 kg	76 kg	139 kg	6
