= Mixed-NOCs at the 2010 Summer Youth Olympics =

Mixed-NOC teams participated under the Olympic flag

Teams made up of athletes representing different National Olympic Committees (NOCs), called mixed-NOCs teams, participated in the 2010 Summer Youth Olympics. These teams participated in either events composed entirely of mixed-NOCs teams, or in events which saw the participation of mixed-NOCs teams and non-mixed-NOCs teams. When a mixed-NOCs team won a medal, the Olympic flag was raised rather than a national flag; if a mixed-NOCs team won gold, the Olympic anthem would be played instead of national anthems.

== Background ==
The concept of mixed-NOCs was newly introduced in the 2010 Summer Youth Olympics, in which athletes from different nations would compete in the same team, often representing their continent. This is in contrast to the Mixed team (IOC code: ZZX) found at early senior Olympic Games.

== Medal summary ==
The following medal summary lists all nations whose athletes won a medal while competing for a mixed-NOCs team. If there is more than one athlete from the same nation on a medal-winning team, only one medal of that colour is credited, so therefore in this medal summary Italy are credited with only one gold rather than five for their participation in the gold-winning fencing team. The summary shows how many events at which a nation had an athlete in a medal-winning mixed-NOCs team; as an example, the United States had athletes in two gold-winning mixed-NOCs teams and athletes in two bronze-winning mixed-NOCs teams and is therefore listed with two golds and two bronzes.

A total of 63 National Olympic Committees, including hosts Singapore, had at least one athlete representing a mixed-NOCs team win a medal.

Mixed-NOCs medals — summary by athletes' nations
* Host nation (Singapore)

Rank	Nation	Gold	Silver	Bronze	Total
1	Italy	3	1	2	6
2	Russia	2	3	1	6
3	Great Britain	2	1	1	4
4	United States	2	0	2	4
5	Poland	1	2	0	3
6	Belgium	1	0	2	3
7	Austria	1	0	1	2
7	Hungary	1	0	1	2
7	Israel	1	0	1	2
7	Ukraine	1	0	1	2
11	Bahamas	1	0	0	1
11	Belarus	1	0	0	1
11	Brazil	1	0	0	1
11	Cuba	1	0	0	1
11	Czech Republic	1	0	0	1
11	Democratic Republic of the Congo	1	0	0	1
11	Dominican Republic	1	0	0	1
11	Jamaica	1	0	0	1
11	Japan	1	0	0	1
11	Kazakhstan	1	0	0	1
11	Peru	1	0	0	1
11	Portugal	1	0	0	1
11	Slovakia	1	0	0	1
11	Spain	1	0	0	1
11	Switzerland	1	0	0	1
26	New Zealand	0	3	0	3
27	Australia	0	2	1	3
27	China	0	2	1	3
27	Germany	0	2	1	3
30	Turkey	0	1	2	3
31	South Africa	0	1	1	2
31	South Korea	0	1	1	2
33	Greece	0	1	0	1
33	Hong Kong	0	1	0	1
33	Malta	0	1	0	1
33	Mongolia	0	1	0	1
33	Nigeria	0	1	0	1
33	Oman	0	1	0	1
33	Senegal	0	1	0	1
33	Slovenia	0	1	0	1
33	Turkmenistan	0	1	0	1
42	Romania	0	0	2	2
43	Algeria	0	0	1	1
43	Andorra	0	0	1	1
43	Argentina	0	0	1	1
43	Bosnia and Herzegovina	0	0	1	1
43	Canada	0	0	1	1
43	Costa Rica	0	0	1	1
43	Egypt	0	0	1	1
43	Fiji	0	0	1	1
43	Honduras	0	0	1	1
43	India	0	0	1	1
43	Libya	0	0	1	1
43	Lithuania	0	0	1	1
43	Mauritius	0	0	1	1
43	Mexico	0	0	1	1
43	Papua New Guinea	0	0	1	1
43	Singapore*	0	0	1	1
43	Tunisia	0	0	1	1
43	Uzbekistan	0	0	1	1
43	Venezuela	0	0	1	1
43	Zimbabwe	0	0	1	1
Totals (62 entries)		30	28	41	99

== Archery ==
Event	Gold	Silver	Bronze
Mixed team	Gloria Filippi (ITA); Anton Karoukin (BLR)	Zoi Paraskevopoulou (GRE); Gregor Rajh (SLO)	Begunhan Unsal (TUR); Abdul Dayyan Jaffar (SIN)

== Athletics ==
Event	Gold	Silver	Bronze
Boys' medley relay	Americas; Caio Cezar dos Santos (BRA); Odean Skeen (JAM); Najee Glass (USA); Luguelín Santos (DOM)	Europe; David Bolarinwa (GBR); Tomasz Kluczynski (POL); Marco Lorenzi (ITA); Nikita Uglov (RUS)	Oceania; Lepani Naivalu (FIJ); John Rivan (PNG); Nicholas Hough (AUS); Raheen Williams (AUS)
Girls' medley relay	Americas; Myasia Jacobs (USA); Tynia Gaither (BAH); Rashan Brown (BAH); Robin Reynolds (USA)	Africa; Josephine Omaka (NGR); Nkiruka Florence Nwakwe (NGR); Izelle Neuhoff (RSA); Bukola Abogunloko (NGR)	Europe; Annie Tagoe (GBR); Anna Bongiorni (ITA); Sonja Mosler (GER); Bianca Răzor (ROU)

== Equestrian ==
Event	Gold	Silver	Bronze
Team jumping	Europe; Martin Fuchs (SUI); Wojciech Dahlke (POL); Valentina Isoardi (ITA); Carian Scudamore (GBR); Nicola Philippaerts (BEL)	Australasia; Zin Man Lai (HKG); Jake Lambert (NZL); Zhengyang Xu (CHN); Sultan Al Tooqi (OMA); Thomas McDermott (AUS)	Africa; Yara Hanssen (ZIM); Zakaria Hamici (ALG); Abduladim Mlitan (LBA); Mohamed Abdalla (EGY); Samantha McIntosh (RSA)

== Fencing ==
Event	Gold	Silver	Bronze
Mixed team	Europe 1 Yana Egoryan (RUS); Marco Fichera (ITA); Camilla Mancini (ITA); Leonardo Affede (ITA); Alberta Santuccio (ITA); Edoardo Luperi (ITA)	Europe 2 Anja Musch (GER); Nikolaus Bodoczi (GER); Victoria Alekseeva (RUS); Richard Hübers (GER); Martyna Swatowska (POL); Tevfik Burak Babaoğlu (TUR)	Americas 1 Celina Merza (USA); Alexandre Lyssov (CAN); Allana Goldie (CAN); Will Spear (USA); Katharine Holmes (USA); Alexander Massilas (USA)

== Judo ==
Event	Gold	Silver	Bronze
Mixed team	Essen; Alex García Mendoza (CUB); Lesly Cano (PER); Kairat Agibayev (KAZ); Andrea Krisandova (SVK); Miku Tashiro (JPN); Pedro Rivadulla (ESP); Daryl Lokuku Ngambomo (COD)	Belgrade; Haley Baxter (NZL); Marius Piepke (GER); Jennet Geldybayeva (TKM); Dulguun Otgonbayar (MGL); Anna Dmitrieva (RUS); Jeremy Saywell (MLT); Lola Mansour (BEL); Babacar Cisse (SEN)	Tokyo; Gaelle Nemorin (MRI); Batuhan Efemgil (TUR); Seul Bi Bae (KOR); Fabio Basile (ITA); Kevin Fernandez (HON); Rotem Shor (ISR); Kseniya Darchuk (UKR); Patrik Ferreira Martins (AND)
Mixed team	Essen; Alex García Mendoza (CUB); Lesly Cano (PER); Kairat Agibayev (KAZ); Andrea Krisandova (SVK); Miku Tashiro (JPN); Pedro Rivadulla (ESP); Daryl Lokuku Ngambomo (COD)	Belgrade; Haley Baxter (NZL); Marius Piepke (GER); Jennet Geldybayeva (TKM); Dulguun Otgonbayar (MGL); Anna Dmitrieva (RUS); Jeremy Saywell (MLT); Lola Mansour (BEL); Babacar Cisse (SEN)	Cairo; Christine Huck (AUT); Eldin Omerovic (BIH); Neha Thakur (IND); Andrea Guillen (CRC); Mansurkhuja Muminkhujaev (UZB); Barbara Matić (CRO); Pedro Pineda (VEN); Ioan Visan (ROU)

== Modern pentathlon ==
Event	Gold	Silver	Bronze
Mixed relay	Anastasiya Spas (UKR); Ilya Shugarov (RUS)	Zhu Wenjing (CHN); Kim Dae-Beom (KOR)	Gulnaz Gubaydullina (RUS); Lukas Kontrimavičius (LTU)

== Table tennis ==
Event	Gold	Silver	Bronze
Mixed team	Won by a team representing the individual NOC of Japan	Won by a team representing the individual NOC of South Korea	Gu Yuting (CHN) and Adem Hmam (TUN)

== Tennis ==
Event	Gold	Silver	Bronze
Boys' doubles	Oliver Golding (GBR) and Jiří Veselý (CZE)	Won by a team representing the individual NOC of Russia	Won by a team representing the individual NOC of Slovakia
Girls' doubles	Won by a team representing the individual NOC of China	Won by a team representing the individual NOC of Slovakia	Tímea Babos (HUN) and An-Sophie Mestach (BEL)

== Triathlon ==
Event	Gold	Silver	Bronze
Mixed relay	Europe 1 Eszter Dudás (HUN); Miguel Valente Fernandes (POR); Fanny Beisaron (ISR); Alois Knabl (AUT)	Oceania 1 Ellie Salthouse (AUS); Michael Gosman (AUS); Maddie Dillon (NZL); Aaron Barclay (NZL)	Americas 1 Kelly Whitley (USA); Kevin McDowell (USA); Adriana Barraza (MEX); Lautaro Diaz (ARG)

== See also ==
- 2010 Summer Youth Olympics medal table
- Mixed-NOCs at the Youth Olympics
