= Moldova at the 2010 Summer Youth Olympics =

- IOC code: MDA
- NOC: Moldova Olympic Committee
- Website: www.olympic.md

in Singapore
- Competitors: 11 in 9 sports
- Flag bearer: Vladislav Arventii
- Medals Ranked 70th: Gold 0 Silver 1 Bronze 1 Total 2

Summer Youth Olympics appearances
- 2010; 2014; 2018; 2026

The Republic of Moldova participated in the 2010 Summer Youth Olympics in Singapore.

== Medalists ==
Medal	Name	Sport	Event	Date
Silver	Iulia Leorda	Wrestling	Women's Freestyle 46kg	16 Aug
Bronze	Daniil Svaresciuc	Boxing	Men's Super Heavy +91kg	24 Aug

== Archery ==
Girls

Athlete	Event	Ranking Round		Round of 32	Round of 16	Quarterfinals	Semifinals	Final	
Athlete	Event	Score	Seed	Opposition Score	Opposition Score	Opposition Score	Opposition Score	Opposition Score	Rank
Alexandra Mirca	Girls’ Individual	626	8	Iryna Hul (BLR); W 7-1	Alice Ingley (AUS); W 6-4	Ye Ji Kwak (KOR); L 4-6	Did not advance		5

Mixed Team

Athlete	Event	Partner	Round of 32	Round of 16	Quarterfinals	Semifinals	Final	
Athlete	Event	Partner	Opposition Score	Opposition Score	Opposition Score	Opposition Score	Opposition Score	Rank
Alexandra Mirca	Mixed Team	Benjamin Hindorg Ipsen (DEN)	Yasaman Shirian (IRI)/ Ibrahim Sabry (EGY); W 6-5	Gloria Filippi (ITA)/ Anton Karoukin (BLR); L 4-6	Did not advance			9

== Athletics ==
=== Boys ===
Field Events

Athletes	Event	Qualification		Final	
Athletes	Event	Result	Rank	Result	Rank
Evgheni Glusco	Boys’ Javelin Throw	65.57	14 qB	69.75	11

=== Girls ===
Track and Road Events

Athletes	Event	Qualification		Final	
Athletes	Event	Result	Rank	Result	Rank
Doina Cravcenco	Girls’ 2000m Steeplechase	6:59.88	5 Q	6:55.20	5

== Boxing ==
Boys

Athlete	Event	Preliminaries	Semifinals	Final	Rank
Daniil Svaresciuc	Super Heavyweight (+91kg)	Alexios Zarntiasvili (GRE); W 6-4	Tony Yoka (FRA); L 0-5	3rd place Bout; Jozsef Zsigmond (HUN); W RET R3 1:29	Bronze medal

== Canoeing ==
Boys

Athlete	Event	Time Trial		Round 1	Round 2 (Rep)	Round 3	Round 4	Round 5	Final
Athlete	Event	Time	Rank	Round 1	Round 2 (Rep)	Round 3	Round 4	Round 5	Final
Alexandru Tiganu	Boys’ C1 Slalom	DSQ		Did not advance					
Alexandru Tiganu	Boys’ C1 Sprint	1:48.88	8	Kutsev (AZE); L 1:51.08-1:48.33	Daniels (CAN); W 1:47.83-DNF	Wang (CHN); W 1:48.80-2:02.75	Melnyk (UKR); L 1:50.57-1:50.25	Did not advance	

== Judo ==
Individual

Athlete	Event	Round 1	Round 2	Round 3	Semifinals	Final	Rank
Athlete	Event	Opposition Result	Opposition Result	Opposition Result	Opposition Result	Opposition Result	Rank
Ghenadie Pretivatii	Boys' -81 kg	Ngambomo (COD); L 000-001	Repechage; Efemgil (TUR); L 001-010	Did not advance			9

Team

Team	Event	Round 1	Round 2	Semifinals	Final	Rank
Team	Event	Opposition Result	Opposition Result	Opposition Result	Opposition Result	Rank
New York; Katelyn Bouyssou (USA); Dmytro Atanov (UKR); Julanda Bacaj (ALB); Matheus Marcia Machado (BRA); Dilara Incedayi (TUR); Ghenadie Pretivatii (MDA); Milica Savic (BIH); Mateja Glusac (SRB)	Mixed Team	BYE	Tokyo; L 4-4 (2-3)	Did not advance		5

== Swimming ==
Athletes	Event	Heat		Semifinal		Final	
Athletes	Event	Time	Position	Time	Position	Time	Position
Serghei Golban	Boys’ 100m Backstroke	58.12	15 Q	57.87	14	Did not advance	
Serghei Golban	Boys’ 100m Butterfly	57.81	25	Did not advance			
Evghenia Tanasienco	Girls’ 50m Breaststroke	33.22	8 Q	33.63	13	Did not advance	
Evghenia Tanasienco	Girls’ 100m Breaststroke	1:14.47	22	Did not advance			

== Taekwondo ==
Athlete	Event	Preliminary	Quarterfinal	Semifinal	Final	Rank
Vladislav Arventii	Boys' -63kg	BYE	Mario Silva (POR); L 3-5	Did not advance		5

== Table tennis ==
Individual

Athlete	Event	Round 1		Round 2		Quarterfinals	Semifinals	Final	Rank
Athlete	Event	Group Matches	Rank	Group Matches	Rank	Quarterfinals	Semifinals	Final	Rank
Olga Bliznet	Girls' Singles	Ivoso (CGO); W 3-0 (11-3, 11-6, 11-3)	2 Q	Sawettabut (THA); L 1-3 (9-11, 8-11, 13-11, 0-11)	2 Q	Yang (KOR); L 0-4 (5-11, 9-11, 8-11, 11-13)	Did not advance		5
Olga Bliznet	Girls' Singles	Yang (KOR); L 0-3 (8-11, 5-11, 8-11)	2 Q	Kumahara (BRA); W 3-0 (11-8, 11-8, 11-6)	2 Q	Yang (KOR); L 0-4 (5-11, 9-11, 8-11, 11-13)	Did not advance		5
Olga Bliznet	Girls' Singles	Pang (FRA); W 3-0 (11-5, 11-7, 11-4)	2 Q	Eerland (NED); W 3-0 (11-7, 11-4, 11-9)	2 Q	Yang (KOR); L 0-4 (5-11, 9-11, 8-11, 11-13)	Did not advance		5

Team

Athlete	Event	Round 1		Round 2	Quarterfinals	Semifinals	Final	Rank
Athlete	Event	Group Matches	Rank	Round 2	Quarterfinals	Semifinals	Final	Rank
Europe 4 Olga Bliznet (MDA); Konrad Kulpa (POL)	Mixed Team	Europe 1 Szocs (ROU); Soderlund (SWE); L 1-2 (0-3, 3-1, 1-3)	2 Q	Singapore; Li (SIN); Chew (SIN); L 0-2 (0-3, 1-3)	Did not advance			9
Europe 4 Olga Bliznet (MDA); Konrad Kulpa (POL)	Mixed Team	Africa 2 Ivoso (CGO); Kam (MRI); W 3-0 (3-0, 3-0, 3-0)	2 Q	Singapore; Li (SIN); Chew (SIN); L 0-2 (0-3, 1-3)	Did not advance			9
Europe 4 Olga Bliznet (MDA); Konrad Kulpa (POL)	Mixed Team	Europe 3 Loveridge (GBR); Mutti (ITA); W 2-1 (3-0, 0-3, 3-1)	2 Q	Singapore; Li (SIN); Chew (SIN); L 0-2 (0-3, 1-3)	Did not advance			9

== Wrestling ==
Freestyle

Athlete	Event	Pools		Final	Rank
Athlete	Event	Groups	Rank	Final	Rank
Iulia Leorda	Girls' 46kg	Holland (AUS); W 2–0 (6–0, 4–0)	1	Miyahara (JPN); L 0–2 (2–4, 0–6)	Silver medal
Iulia Leorda	Girls' 46kg	Gannouni (TUN); W Fall (7–1, 5–2)	1	Miyahara (JPN); L 0–2 (2–4, 0–6)	Silver medal
Iulia Leorda	Girls' 46kg	Mertens (GER); W 2–0 (4–0, 3–0)	1	Miyahara (JPN); L 0–2 (2–4, 0–6)	Silver medal
