= Archery at the 2010 Summer Youth Olympics – Boys' individual =

Boys' individual at the I Summer Youth Olympic Games
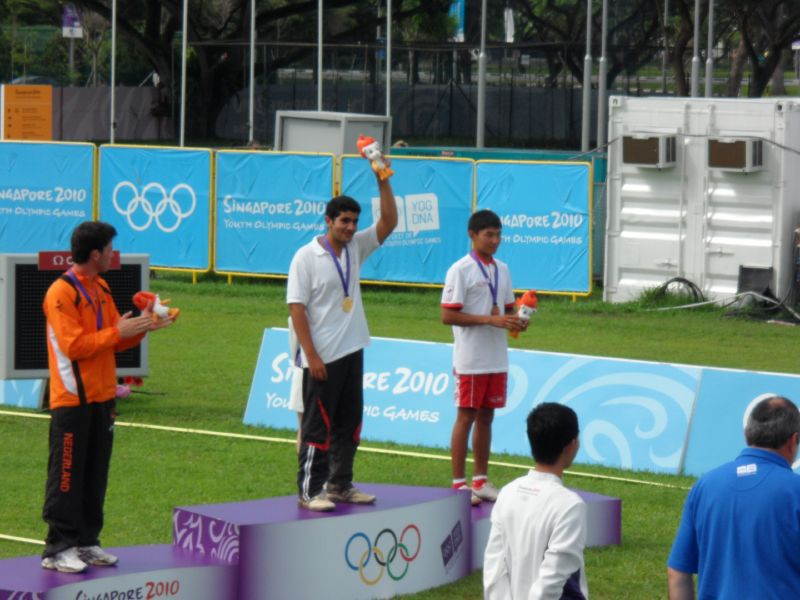
- Medal presentation at the conclusion of the event
- Venue: Kallang Field
- Date: 18–21 August
- Competitors: 32 from 32 nations

Medalists
1st place, gold medalist(s)		Ibrahim Sabry	Egypt
2nd place, silver medalist(s)		Rick van den Oever	Netherlands
3rd place, bronze medalist(s)		Bolot Tsybzhitov	Russia

The boys' individual archery event at the 2010 Summer Youth Olympics was part of the archery programme. It took place at the Kallang Field. Ranking Round was on 18 August 2010. First elimination round took place on 18 August, and eights, quarterfinal, semifinals and medals matches were on 21 August. All archery was done at a range of 70 metres, with targets 1.22 metres in diameter.

== Results ==
=== Ranking Round ===
Rank	Archer	1st Half	2nd Half	10s	Xs	Score
1	Rick van den Oever (NED)	321	332	24	6	653
2	Park Min-beom (KOR)	331	320	14	3	651
3	Mark Nesbitt (GBR)	322	316	21	7	638
4	Bolot Tsybzhitov (RUS)	324	314	12	7	638
5	Atanu Das (IND)	314	323	18	4	637
6	Gregor Rajh (SLO)	320	316	19	6	636
7	Luo Siyue (CHN)	315	321	14	5	636
8	Tsukushi Koiwa (JPN)	305	330	20	6	635
9	Benjamin Nott (AUS)	313	321	20	7	634
10	Ibrahim Sabry (EGY)	308	323	20	5	631
11	Yagiz Yilmaz (TUR)	305	326	13	4	631
12	Emdadul Haque Milon (BAN)	319	309	18	6	628
13	Ku Yuan-hsiang (TPE)	312	308	20	6	620
14	Abdul Dayyan bin Mohamed Jaffar (SIN)	311	307	15	5	618
15	Axel Muller (SUI)	303	313	0	0	616
16	Vasil Shahnazaryan (ARM)	315	298	8	3	613
17	Carlos Rivas (ESP)	295	346	15	10	611
18	Vitaliy Komonyuk (UKR)	308	302	13	2	610
19	Julien Rossignol (FRA)	301	305	16	2	606
20	František Hajduk (CZE)	301	302	17	3	603
21	Timon Park (CAN)	299	302	10	3	601
22	Lorenzo Pianesi (ITA)	290	308	11	2	598
23	Anton Karoukin (BLR)	286	305	8	4	591
24	Benjamin Hindborg Ipsen (DEN)	281	296	9	2	577
25	Ben Chu (USA)	288	289	6	2	577
26	Teodor Todorov (BUL)	293	279	10	3	572
27	Sebastian Linster (HUN)	293	266	14	3	559
28	Joni Hautamaki (FIN)	286	273	8	3	559
29	Maciej Jaworski (POL)	273	280	5	1	553
30	Tanapat Harikul (THA)	265	270	0	0	535
31	Aung Gyi (MYA)	171	241	3	1	412
32	Jafet Farjat (MEX)	148	164	3	1	312

=== Draw ===
==== Finals ====
Semifinals
1	Rick van den Oever (NED)	6 (29,27,27,29,28)
4	Bolot Tsybzhitov (RUS)	4 (26,28,28,26,27)
6	Gregor Rajh (SLO)	2 (26,24,27,26)
10	Ibrahim Sabry (EGY)	6 (30,27,27,26)

Final
1	Rick van den Oever (NED)	0 (28,25,27)
10	Ibrahim Sabry (EGY)	6 (29,27,28)
Bronze medal match
4	Bolot Tsybzhitov (RUS)	6 (29,27,27)
6	Gregor Rajh (SLO)	0 (24,25,26)

==== Top half ====
First Round
1	Rick van den Oever (NED)	6 (27,28,26,25)
32	Jafet Farjat (MEX)	2 (24,24,27,23)
17	Carlos Rivas (ESP)	7 (26,22,26,25)
16	Vasil Shahnazaryam (ARM)	1 (24,22,24,24)
9	Benjamin Nott (AUS)	6 (24,25,27,27,24)
24	Benjamin Hindborg Ipsen (DEN)	4 (24,27,18,19,24)
25	Ben Chu (USA)	4 (21,26,25,19,27)
8	Tsukushi Koiwa (JPN)	6 (25,26,24,27,27)
5	Atanu Das (IND)	5^{T8} (24,27,24,29,26)
28	Joni Hautamaki (FIN)	6^{T9} (22,27,26,24,27)
21	Timon Park (CAN)	2 (27,25,28,25)
12	Emdadul Haque Milon (BAN)	6 (27,28,28,27)
13	Ku Yuan-hsiang (TPE)	4 (19,22,30,27,27)
20	František Hajduk (CZE)	6 (26,24,26,23,29)
29	Maciej Jaworski (POL)	0 (23,23,22)
4	Bolot Tsybzhitov (RUS)	6 (26,26,27)

Second Round
1	Rick van den Oever (NED)	6 (27,30,26)
17	Carlos Rivas (ESP)	0 (21,25,23)
9	Benjamin Nott (AUS)	6 (26,25,28,26,26)
8	Tsukushi Koiwa (JPN)	4 (27,24,26,29,22)
28	Joni Hautamaki (FIN)	0 (22,24,25)
12	Emdadul Haque Milon (BAN)	6 (24,25,28)
20	František Hajduk (CZE)	0 (27,23,24)
4	Bolot Tsybzhitov (RUS)	6 (29,29,25)

Quarterfinals
1	Rick van den Oever (NED)	6 (25,26,29,23,28)
9	Benjamin Nott (AUS)	4 (27,23,25,29,27)
12	Emdadul Haque Milon (BAN)	0 (26,23,28)
4	Bolot Tsybzhitov (RUS)	6 (28,27,29)

Semifinals
1	Rick van den Oever (NED)	6 (29,27,27,29,28)
4	Bolot Tsybzhitov (RUS)	4 (26,28,28,26,27)

==== Bottom half ====
First Round
3	Mark Nesbitt (GBR)	7 (27,27,28,25,26)
30	Tanapat Harikul (THA)	3 (30,25,28,19,19)
19	Julien Rossignol (FRA)	1 (21,26,25,24)
14	Abdul Dayyan bin Mohamed Jaffar (SIN)	7 (27,26,26,28)
11	Yagiz Yilmaz (TUR)	6^{T10} (28,28,26,27,27)
22	Lorenzo Pianesi (ITA)	5^{T7} (28,26,27,29,26)
27	Sebastian Linster (HUN)	4 (24,25,22,25,17)
6	Gregor Rajh (SLO)	6 (27,22,27,21,27)
7	Luo Siyue (CHN)	0 (22,27,23)
26	Teodor Todorov (BUL)	6 (24,28,26)
23	Anton Karoukin (BLR)	5^{T10} (27,29,27,27,25)
10	Ibrahim Sabry (EGY)	6^{T10*} (25,29,28,24,26)
15	Axel Muller (SUI)	6 (28,29,25,28)
18	Vitaliy Komonyuk (UKR)	2 (25,27,29,25)
31	Aung Gyi (MYA)	0 (22,18,20)
2	Park Min-beom (KOR)	6 (30,28,29)

Second Round
3	Mark Nesbitt (GBR)	4 (25,29,25,22,25)
14	Abdul Dayyan bin Mohamed Jaffar (SIN)	6 (25,26,26,25,27)
11	Yagiz Yilmaz (TUR)	3 (24,26,26,22,24)
6	Gregor Rajh (SLO)	7 (25,26,25,25,28)
26	Teodor Todorov (BUL)	0 (20,22,26)
10	Ibrahim Sabry (EGY)	6 (26,27,29)
15	Axel Muller (SUI)	0 (23,26,24)
2	Park Min-beom (KOR)	6 (26,27,27)

Quarterfinals
14	Abdul Dayyan bin Mohamed Jaffar (SIN)	0 (26,20,23)
6	Gregor Rajh (SLO)	6 (28,26,27)
10	Ibrahim Sabry (EGY)	7 (29,25,29,28,29)
2	Park Min-beom (KOR)	3 (28,28,27,28,28)

Semifinals
6	Gregor Rajh (SLO)	2 (26,24,27,26)
10	Ibrahim Sabry (EGY)	6 (30,27,27,26)
