= Boxing at the 2010 Summer Youth Olympics – Men's +91 kg =

Boxing competitions

These are the results of the Men's Super Heavy +91 kg competition in boxing at the 2010 Summer Youth Olympics in Singapore. Preliminaries were held on August 21, semifinals on August 22, 5th place bout on August 23, the bronze medal bout on August 24 and the Final bout on August 25. Unlike world championships and the Olympic Games, only one bronze medal is awarded.

== Medalists ==
Tony Yoka
France
Joseph Parker
New Zealand
Daniil Svaresciuc
Moldova

== Results ==
Preliminaries
Alexios Zarntiasvili (GRE)	4
Daniil Svaresciuc (MDA)	6
Oleksandr Skoryi (UKR)	RSC R2; 2:58
Tony Yoka (FRA)

Semifinals
Jozsef Zsigmond (HUN)	1
Joseph Parker (NZL)	5
Daniil Svaresciuc (MDA)	0
Tony Yoka (FRA)	5

Final
Joseph Parker (NZL)	5
Tony Yoka (FRA)	8
Third place
Jozsef Zsigmond (HUN)
Daniil Svaresciuc (MDA)	RET R3 1:29

5th place bout
Alexios Zarntiasvili (GRE)
Oleksandr Skoryi (UKR)	WO
