= Wrestling at the 2010 Summer Youth Olympics – Girls' freestyle 46 kg =

The girls' 46 kg tournament in wrestling at the 2010 Summer Youth Olympics was held on August 16 at the International Convention Centre.

The event limited competitors to a maximum of 46 kilograms of body mass. The tournament had two groups where wrestlers compete in a round-robin format. The winners of each group would go on to play for the gold medal, second placers played for the bronze medal while everyone else played for classification depending on where they ranked in the group stage.

== Medalists ==
Gold	Silver	Bronze
Yu Miyahara; Japan	Iulia Leorda; Moldova	Petra Olli; Finland

== Group stages ==
=== Group A ===
Athlete	Pld	C. Points	T. Points
Yu Miyahara (JPN)	2	7	12
Petra Olli (FIN)	2	3	7
Oriannys Segura (VEN)	2	2	2

Petra Olli (FIN)	0-2 (1-1, 0-5)	Yu Miyahara (JPN)
Petra Olli (FIN)	2-0 (1–0, 5–1)	Oriannys Segura (VEN)
Yu Miyahara (JPN)	2-0 (4–1, 2–0)	Oriannys Segura (VEN)

=== Group B ===
Athlete	Pld	C. Points	T. Points
Iulia Leorda (MDA)	3	10	29
Laura Mertens (GER)	3	6	17
Carissa Holland (AUS)	3	4	5
Ikram Gannouni (TUN)	3	1	10

Carissa Holland (AUS)	0-2 (0-4, 0-3)	Laura Mertens (GER)
Ikram Gannouni (TUN)	Fall (1-7, 2-5)	Iulia Leorda (MDA)
Carissa Holland (AUS)	Fall (0-3, 5–3)	Ikram Gannouni (TUN)
Laura Mertens (GER)	0-2 (0-4, 0-3)	Iulia Leorda (MDA)
Carissa Holland (AUS)	0-2 (0-6, 0-4)	Iulia Leorda (MDA)
Laura Mertens (GER)	2-0 (4–1, 6–0)	Ikram Gannouni (TUN)

== Classification ==
=== 5th-place match ===
Oriannys Segura (VEN)	2-0 (4–0, 5–0)	Carissa Holland (AUS)

=== Bronze-medal match ===
Petra Olli (FIN)	2-1 (2-4, 3–0, 1–0)	Laura Mertens (GER)

=== Gold-medal match ===
Yu Miyahara (JPN)	2-0 (4–2, 6–0)	Iulia Leorda (MDA)

== Final rankings ==
Rank	Athlete
Gold medal	Yu Miyahara (JPN)
Silver medal	Iulia Leorda (MDA)
Bronze medal	Petra Olli (FIN)
4	Laura Mertens (GER)
5	Oriannys Segura (VEN)
6	Carissa Holland (AUS)
7	Ikram Gannouni (TUN)
