= Yu Miyahara =

Japanese sport wrestler

Medal record

Representing Japan

Women's wrestling

Asian Wrestling Championships
Bronze medal – third place	2018 Bishkek	53 kg

Goldend Grand Prix Ivan Yarygin
Bronze medal – third place	2015 Krasnoyarsk	48 kg

Youth Olympic Games
Gold medal – first place	2010 Singapore	46 kg

Yu Miyahara (宮原 優, Miyahara Yū) is a Japanese wrestler who participated at the 2010 Summer Youth Olympics in Singapore. She won the gold medal in the girls' freestyle 46 kg event, defeating Lulia Leorda of Moldova in the final.
