= Brina Božič =

Slovenian archer (born 1992)

Brina Bozic
Personal information
- Born: 22 May 1992 (age 34)

Sport
- Country: Slovenia
- Sport: Archery
- Event: recurve
- Updated on 10 September 2015

Brina Bozic (born 22 May 1992) is a Slovenian recurve archer.

She competed in the individual recurve event at the 2015 World Archery Championships in Copenhagen, Denmark.
