= Gloria Filippi =

Italian archer (born 1992)

Personal information
- Nationality: Italian
- Born: 28 May 1992 (age 34) Rovereto, Italy

Sport
- Country: Italy
- Sport: Archery
Medal record
Women's archery
Representing Italy
Indoor World Championships
Bronze medal – third place	2009 Rzeszów	Junior recurve
Representing a (International Olympic Committee) mixed-NOCs team
Youth Olympic Games
Gold medal – first place	2010 Singapore	Mixed team

Gloria Filippi (born 28 May 1992) is an Italian archer. Born in Rovereto, she participated at the 2010 Summer Youth Olympics in Singapore. She was eliminated in the first round of the girls' event; she paired up with Anton Karoukin of Belarus and won gold in the mixed team event, defeating Zoi Paraskevopoulou of Greece and Gregor Rajh of Slovenia in the gold medal match.
