= Mai Okubo =

Japanese association football player

Personal information
- Date of birth: 3 September 1996 (age 30)
- Place of birth: Yamanashi Prefecture, Japan
- Height: 1.61 m (5 ft 3 in)
- Position: Midfielder

Team information
- Current team: AC Nagano Parceiro Ladies
- Number: 6

Senior career*
Years	Team	Apps	(Gls)
- AC Nagano Parceiro Ladies
- * Club domestic league appearances and goals

Mai Okubo (born 3 September 1996) is a Japanese professional footballer who plays as a midfielder for WE League club AC Nagano Parceiro Ladies.

== Club career ==
Okubo made her WE League debut on 12 September 2021.
