= Axel Müller (archer) =

Swiss archer (born 1992)

Axel Müller (born 3 January 1992 in Genolier, Switzerland) is a Swiss archer. He competed in the individual event at the 2012 Summer Olympics, finishing in the last 64. He lost to the eventual gold medalist Oh Jin-hyek. He qualified by finishing 4th in the qualification competition in Ogden. He was the first Swiss archer to qualify for the Olympics in 28 years. Previously, he finished 9th at the Youth Olympics in 2010.
