= Anton Karoukin =

Belarusian archer

Medal record

Men's recurve archery

Representing Belarus

European Indoor Championships
Silver medal – second place	2022 Laško	Team

Representing a (International Olympic Committee) mixed-NOCs team

Youth Olympic Games
Gold medal – first place	2010 Singapore	Mixed team

Anton Karoukin is a Belarusian archer who participated at the 2010 Summer Youth Olympics in Singapore. He was eliminated in the first round of the individual event by eventual champion Ibrahim Sabry on a tiebreak. He paired up with Gloria Filippi of Italy and won gold in the mixed team event, defeating Zoi Paraskevopoulou of Greece and Gregor Rajh of Slovenia in the gold medal match.

He won the silver medal in the men's team recurve event at the 2022 European Indoor Archery Championships held in Laško, Slovenia.
