= Abdul Dayyan Jaffar =

Singaporean archer (born 1993)

Medal record

Men's archery

Representing a (International Olympic Committee) mixed-NOCs team

Youth Olympic Games
Bronze medal – third place	2010 Singapore	Mixed team

Abdud Dayyan bin Mohamed Jaffar (born 13 September 1993) is a Singaporean archer who participated at the 2010 Summer Youth Olympics in his home city. He was eliminated in the quarterfinals of the individual event by Gregor Rajh. He paired up with Begünhan Ünsal of Turkey and won bronze in the mixed team event.
