= Begünhan Elif Ünsal =

Turkish archer (born 1993)

Begünhan Elif Oruç
Personal information
- Born: 4 January 1993 (age 33) Isparta, Turkey

Sport
- Country: Turkey
- Sport: Archery
- Event: Recurve
Medal record
Women's archery
Representing a (International Olympic Committee) mixed-NOCs team
European Championships
Silver medal – second place	2010 Poreč	Indoor Ind.
Bronze medal – third place	2010 Rovereto	Outdoor Ind.
European Junior Cup
Gold medal – first place	2010 Reggio Calabria	Team
Youth Olympic Games
Bronze medal – third place	2010 Singapore	Mixed team

Begünhan Elif Oruç (born 4 January 1993) is a Turkish archer.

== Private life ==
Begünhan Elif Oruç was born in Isparta, Turkey on 4 January 1993. After finishing private high school in Altınbaşak College, she studied Sports Science at the Faculty of Health Science in Süleyman Demirel University in her hometown.

== Sports career ==
Ünsal began her archery career at age ten, inspired by her older sister, also an archer, and encouraged by her father. Ünsal is trained by her father Yalçın Ünsal.

She participated at the 2010 Summer Youth Olympics in Singapore. She was eliminated in the second round in the individual event by the silver medallist Tan Ya-Ting. She paired up with Abdul Dayyan bin Mohamed Jaffar of Singapore to win bronze in the mixed team event.

Ünsal won the silver medal in the youth category and the bronze medal in the senior category at the 2010 Archery European Indoor Championships held in Poreč, Croatia. At the 2010 European Archery Championships held in Rovereto, Italy, Ünsal became the bronze medalist. She won a gold medal in the team event of the 2010 European Junior Cu, which took place in Reggio Calabria, Italy.
