= Kallang Field =

Sports field in Kallang, Singapore

Coordinates: 1°18′14″N 103°52′48″E

Kallang Field is a sports field located in Kallang, Singapore. It is part of the Kallang Sports Complex, near where the Singapore Indoor Stadium and the Singapore Sports Hub are.

== History ==
Kallang Field and the adjacent Tennis Centre are part of the Kallang Sports Complex.

Currently home to Singapore's cricketers, the field is also used for softball.

Spanning an area of more than 50,000 square metres (540,000 ft^{2}), the Kallang Field was the venue for the prestigious Singer Cup cricket tournament in 1996, involving teams from India, Pakistan and Sri Lanka. In 1999, a one-day international tournament involving India, West Indies and Zimbabwe was also hosted here.

== 2010 Summer Youth Olympics ==
The Kallang Field was upgraded and converted to host the archery competitions during the 2010 Summer Youth Olympics.
