= Gregor Rajh =

Slovenian archer

Medal record

Men's archery

Representing a (International Olympic Committee) mixed-NOCs team

Youth Olympic Games
Silver medal – second place	2010 Singapore	Mixed team

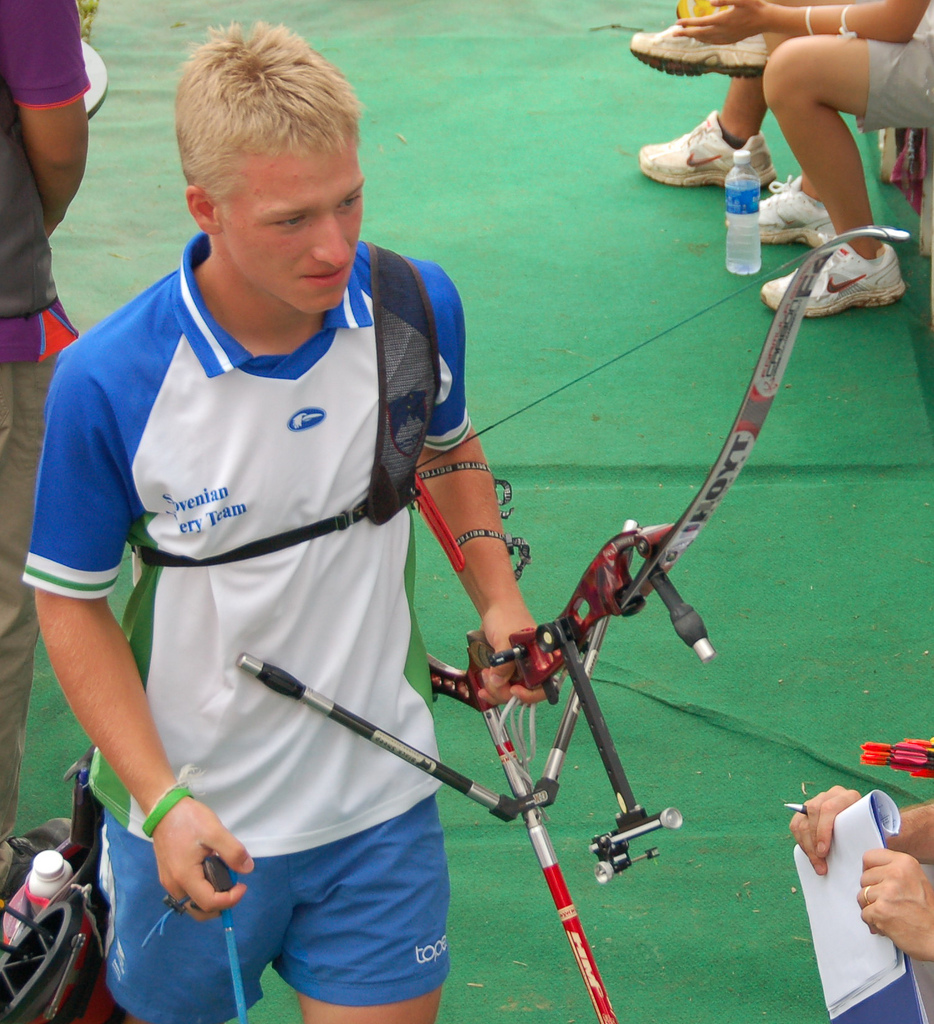
Gregor Rajh preparing for a match at Singapore 2010 Youth Olympic Games.

Gregor Rajh is a Slovenian archer who participated at the 2010 Summer Youth Olympics in Singapore. He finished fourth in the boys' event, losing to Bolot Tsybzhitov of Russia in the bronze medal match. He paired up with Zoi Paraskevopoulou of Greece to win silver in the mixed team event, losing to Gloria Filippi and Anton Karoukin in the gold medal match.
