= Bolot Tsybzhitov =

Russian archer (born 1994)

Personal information
- Native name: Болот Цыбжитов
- Born: 23 November 1994 (age 31) Suduntuy, Agin-Buryat Okrug, Chita Oblast, Russia
Medal record
Men's archery
Representing Russia
European Championships
Bronze medal – third place	2014 Echmiadzin	Men's Team
Youth Olympic Games
Bronze medal – third place	2010 Singapore	Individual

Bolot Belikovich Tsybzhitov (Russian: Болот Бэликович Цыбжитов, born 23 November 1994 in Suduntuy, Agin-Buryat Okrug, Zabaykalsky Krai) is a Russian archer who participated at the 2010 Summer Youth Olympics in Singapore. He won the bronze medal in the boys' event, defeating the mixed team silver medallist Gregor Rajh of Slovenia in the bronze medal match.
