= Miriam Alarcón =

Spanish archer (born 1993)

Personal information
- Born: 27 June 1993 (age 33)

Sport
- Country: Spain
- Sport: Archery
- Event: recurve
- Updated on 10 September 2015

Miriam Alarcón (born 27 June 1993) is a Spanish recurve archer.

Alarcón represented her country at the 2008 (in Antalya), 2009 (in Ogden) and 2010 (in Legnica) World Youth Archery Championships. She competed at the 2010 Summer Youth Olympics, the inaugural Youth Olympic Games, held in Singapore.

In June 2015, Alarcón represented her country at the 2015 European Games in Baku, Azerbaijan.

In early July 2015, Alarcón represented her country at the 2015 Summer Universiade, in Gwangju, South Korea.

In late July 2015, she competed in the individual recurve event and the team recurve event at the 2015 World Archery Championships in Copenhagen, Denmark.
