= Emdadul Haque Milon =

Bangladeshi archer

Mohammed Emdadul Haque Milon (Bengali: এমদাদুল হক মিলন; born 25 February 1993 in Dhaka, Bangladesh) is a Bangladeshi archer. He competed in the individual event at the 2012 Summer Olympics.
