= United States at the 2010 Summer Youth Olympics =

- Flag of the United States
- IOC code: USA
- NOC: United States Olympic Committee
- Website: www.teamusa.org

in Singapore
- Competitors: 82 in 18 sports
- Flag bearer: Hannah Carson
- Medals Ranked 13th: Gold 4 Silver 9 Bronze 8 Total 21

Summer Youth Olympics appearances (overview)
- 2010; 2014; 2018; 2026

The United States participated in the 2010 Summer Youth Olympics in Singapore.

The U.S. Team consisted of 82 athletes competing in 18 sports: aquatics (swimming and diving), archery, badminton, basketball, boxing, equestrian, fencing, gymnastics, judo, modern pentathlon, sailing, table tennis, taekwondo, track & field, triathlon, volleyball, weightlifting and wrestling.

== Medalists ==
The following U.S. competitors won medals at the games. In the discipline sections below, the medalists' names are bolded. Medalist names that are italicized in this section won the medal as part of a team of athletes from mixed NOCs and these medals are not counted in the totals.

Medal	Name	Sport	Event	Date
Gold	Kaitlyn Jones	Swimming	Girls' 200 m individual medley	August 15
Gold	Robin Reynolds	Athletics	Girls' 400 m	August 21
Gold	Maxamillian Schneider	Judo	Boys' 66 kg	August 21
Gold	Katelyn Bouyssou	Judo	Girls' 52 kg	August 22
Gold	Najee Glass	Athletics	Boys' medley relay	August 23
Gold	Myasia Jacobs; Robin Reynolds	Athletics	Girls' medley relay	August 23
Silver	Celina Merza	Fencing	Girls' sabre	August 16
Silver	Kiera Janzen	Swimming	Girls' 400 m freestyle	August 16
Silver	Kevin McDowell	Triathlon	Boys' individual	August 16
Silver	Alexander Massialas	Fencing	Boys' foil	August 17
Silver	Kaitlyn Jones	Swimming	Girls' 200 m backstroke	August 17
Silver	Jordan Rogers	Wrestling	Boys' freestyle 76 kg	August 17
Silver	Myasia Jacobs	Athletics	Girls' 100 m	August 21
Silver	Devin Bogert	Athletics	Boys' javelin throw	August 22
Silver	USA Girls' volleyball team: Samantha Cash; Crystal Graff; Micha Hancock; Jade Hayes; Christina Higgins; Madison Kamp; Madison Mahaffey; Liz McMahon; Katie Mitchell; Tiffany Morales; Olivia Okoro; Taylor Simpson	Volleyball	Girls' tournament	August 25
Bronze	Gregory English	Taekwondo	Boys' 48 kg	August 15
Bronze	Kelly Whitley	Triathlon	Girls' individual	August 15
Bronze	Jessie Bates	Taekwondo	Girls' 49 kg	August 16
Bronze	Katharine Holmes; Alexander Massalias; Celina Merza; Will Spear	Fencing	Mixed team	August 18
Bronze	Kevin McDowell; Kelly Whitley	Triathlon	Mixed relay	August 19
Bronze	Le'Tristan Pledger	Athletics	Girls' long jump	August 21
Bronze	Olivia Ekpone	Athletics	Girls' 200 m	August 22
Bronze	Hannah Carson	Athletics	Girls' javelin throw	August 22
Bronze	Michael Hixon	Diving	Boys' 3 m springboard	August 22
Bronze	Briyona Canty; Andraya Carter; Amber Henson; Kiah Stokes	Basketball	Girls' tournament	August 23

Medals by sport
Sport	1st place, gold medalist(s)	2nd place, silver medalist(s)	3rd place, bronze medalist(s)	Total
Judo	2	0	0	**2**
Athletics	1	2	3	**6**
Swimming	1	2	0	**3**
Fencing	0	2	0	**2**
Triathlon	0	1	1	**2**
Volleyball	0	1	0	**1**
Wrestling	0	1	0	**1**
Taekwondo	0	0	2	**2**
Basketball	0	0	1	**1**
Diving	0	0	1	**1**
Total	4	9	8	21

Medals by day
Day	Date	1st place, gold medalist(s)	2nd place, silver medalist(s)	3rd place, bronze medalist(s)	Total
1	August 15	1	0	2	**3**
2	August 16	0	3	1	**4**
3	August 17	0	3	0	**3**
4	August 18	0	0	0	**0**
5	August 19	0	0	0	**0**
6	August 20	0	0	0	**0**
7	August 21	2	1	1	**4**
8	August 22	1	1	3	**5**
9	August 23	0	0	1	**1**
10	August 24	0	0	0	**0**
11	August 25	0	1	0	**1**
12	August 26	0	0	0	**0**
Total		4	9	8	21

Medals by gender
Gender	1st place, gold medalist(s)	2nd place, silver medalist(s)	3rd place, bronze medalist(s)	Total	Percentage
Female	3	5	6	**14**	66.7%
Male	1	4	2	**7**	33.3%
Total	4	9	8	21	100%

Multiple medalists
Name	Sport	1st place, gold medalist(s)	2nd place, silver medalist(s)	3rd place, bronze medalist(s)	Total
Kaitlyn Jones	Swimming	1	1	0	**2**

== Archery ==
Athlete	Event	Ranking Round		Round of 32	Round of 16	Quarterfinals	Semifinals	Final	
Athlete	Event	Score	Seed	Opposition Score	Opposition Score	Opposition Score	Opposition Score	Opposition Score	Rank
Ben Chu	Boys' individual	577	25	Koiwa (JPN); L 4-6	Did not advance				17
Miranda Leek	Girls' individual	550	27	Tukebayeva (KAZ); W 6-4	Viehmeier (GER); L 2-6	Did not advance			9
Ben Chu; Lidiia Sichenikova (UKR)	Mixed NOCs team	—N/a		Bozic (SLO) / Nott (AUS); L 5-6	Did not advance				17
Miranda Leek; Atanu Das (IND)	Mixed NOCs team	—N/a		Custers (NED) / Shahnazaryan (ARM); L 4-6	Did not advance				17

== Athletics ==
Note: The athletes who do not have a "Q" next to their Qualification Rank advance to a non-medal ranking final.

Boys
Track and Road Events

Athletes	Event	Qualification		Final	
Athletes	Event	Result	Rank	Result	Rank
Brandon Sanders	200 m	21.81	7 Q	21.44	4
Najee Glass	400 m	47.83	7 Q	47.65	6
Gregory Coleman	400 m hurdles	DSQ*		DNS	
Daniel Wong	2000 m steeplechase	6:05.92	8 Q	5:57.29	8
Americas; Caios Dos Santos (BRA); Najee Glass; Luguelín Santos (DOM); Odean Skeen (JAM)	Medley relay	—N/a		1:51.38	1st place, gold medalist(s)
Tyler Sorenson	10 km walk	—N/a		47:07.77	10

Field Events

Athletes	Event	Qualification		Final	
Athletes	Event	Result	Rank	Result	Rank
Gunnar Nixon	High jump	2.10	4 Q	2.11	=6
Reese Watson	Pole vault	4.60	9 qB	4.50	10
Devin Bogert	Javelin throw	74.24	3 Q	76.88	2nd place, silver medalist(s)

*Coleman was disqualified due to a hurdle fault resulting from a trailing leg.

Girls
Track and Road Events

Athletes	Event	Qualification		Final	
Athletes	Event	Result	Rank	Result	Rank
Myasia Jacobs	100 m	11.74	2 Q	11.64	2nd place, silver medalist(s)
Olivia Ekpone	200 m	24.05	2 Q	23.75	3rd place, bronze medalist(s)
Robin Reynolds	400 m	53.21	2 Q	52.57	1st place, gold medalist(s)
Claudia Francis	1000 m	2:51.99	9 Q	2:55.73	12
Trinity Wilson	100m hurdles	13.88	6 Q	13.71	6
Amber Bryant Brock	400m hurdles	59.46	3 Q	1:00.72	6
Americas; Rashan Brown (BAH); Tynia Gaither (BAH); Myasia Jacobs; Robin Reynolds	Medley relay	—N/a		2:05.62	1st place, gold medalist(s)

Field Events

Athlete	Event	Qualification		Final	
Athlete	Event	Result	Rank	Result	Rank
Le'Tristan Pledger	Long jump	6.01	3 Q	6.17	3rd place, bronze medalist(s)
Reed Hancock	Pole vault	NM qB		3.30	14
Sarah Howard	Shot put	13.87	7 Q	13.44	8
Hannah Carson	Javelin throw	48.64	5 Q	50.64	3rd place, bronze medalist(s)
Sarah Tolson	Discus throw	42.58	10 qB	44.97	9
Shelby Ashe	Hammer throw	58.01	3 Q	49.16	8

== Badminton ==
Athlete	Event	Group Stage				Quarterfinal	Semifinal	Final	
Athlete	Event	Opposition Result	Opposition Result	Opposition Result	Rank	Opposition Result	Opposition Result	Opposition Result	Rank
Zenas Lam	Boys' singles	Chongo (ZAM); W 2-0 (21-15, 21-14)	Castillo (MEX); L 0-2 (18-21, 9-21)	Kang (KOR); L 0-2 (16-21, 9-21)	3	Did not advance			
Cee Nantana Ketpura	Girls' singles	Mathis (AUT); W 2-0 (21-10, 21-9)	Milne (GBR); L 0-2 (19-21, 19-21)	Palermo (FRA); W 2-0 (21-13, 21-13)	2	Did not advance			

== Basketball ==
Athletes	Event	Group Stage					Quarterfinal	Semifinal	Final / BM	
Athletes	Event	Opposition Result	Opposition Result	Opposition Result	Opposition Result	Rank	Opposition Result	Opposition Result	Opposition Result	Rank
Kyle Caudill; Angelo Chol; Sterling Gibbs (C); Brandan Kearney	Boys' tournament	Turkey; W 23–17	Israel; W 27–20	Singapore; W 31–21	Central African Republic; W 32–28	1	Spain; W 28–18	Serbia; L 29–34	Bronze final Greece; L 25–34	4
Briyona Canty; Andraya Carter; Amber Henson; Kiah Stokes (C)	Girls' tournament	Angola; W 30–8	Singapore; W 34–11	Germany; W 33–6	Belarus; W 33–5	1	South Korea; W 34–10	Australia; L 23–25	Bronze final Canada; W 34–16	3rd place, bronze medalist(s)

== Boxing ==
Athlete	Event	Preliminaries	Semifinals	Final	Rank
Joshua Temple	Heavyweight (91 kg)	Pero (CUB); L RSC	Did not advance	5th place bout Ivanov (RUS); L RSC	6

== Diving ==
Athlete	Event	Preliminary		Final	
Athlete	Event	Points	Rank	Points	Rank
Michael Hixon	Boys' 3m springboard	541.15	3 Q	554.65	3rd place, bronze medalist(s)
Annika Lenz	Girls' 3m Springboard	341.45	12 Q	380.70	8
Annika Lenz	Girls' 10m Platform	407.00	3 Q	429.50	4

== Equestrian ==
Athlete	Horse	Event	Round 1		Round 2		Total		Jump-off		
Athlete	Horse	Event	Penalties	Rank	Penalties	Rank	Penalties	Rank	Penalties	Time	Rank
Eirin Bruheim	Lenny Hays	Individual jumping	8	16	4	8	12	17	Did not advance		
Kelsey Bayley (BAR)	Virtuous Flare	Team jumping	8	—N/a	~~13~~	—N/a			Did not advance		
Eirin Bruheim	Lenny Hays	Team jumping	~~16~~	—N/a	~~21~~	—N/a			Did not advance		
Juan Diego Saenz Morel (GUA)	Little Plains	Team jumping	4	—N/a	8	—N/a			Did not advance		
Alejandra Ortiz (PAN)	Sobraon Park Fancy Pants	Team jumping	~~8~~	—N/a	8	—N/a			Did not advance		
Dominique Shone (CAN)	Roxy Girl	Team jumping	4	—N/a	0	—N/a			Did not advance		
North/Central America & Caribbean Islands		Team jumping	16	6	16	6	32	6	Did not advance		

== Fencing ==
Boys

Athlete	Event	Group stage							Round of 16	Quarterfinal	Semifinal	Final / BM	
Athlete	Event	Opposition Result	Opposition Result	Opposition Result	Opposition Result	Opposition Result	Opposition Result	Rank	Opposition Result	Opposition Result	Opposition Result	Opposition Result	Rank
Alexander Massialas	Boys’ foil	Choi (HKG); W 5–3	Choupenitch (CZE); W 5–1	Tsoronis (DEN); W 5–2	Babaoğlu (TUR); W 5–0	Rosabal (CUB); W 5–2	Ong (SIN); W 5–0	1	Bye	Tofalides (GBR); W 15–12	Lee (KOR); W 15–8	Luperi (ITA); L 11–15	2nd place, silver medalist(s)
Will Spear	Boys’ sabre	Szatmári (HUN); W 5–3	Okunev (RUS); W 5–2	Mallette (CAN); L 3–5	Affede (ITA); L 1–5	Song (KOR); W 5–1	—N/a	6	Elsissy (EGY); W 15–10	Affede (ITA); L 9–15	Did not advance		6

Girls

Athlete	Event	Group stage							Round of 16	Quarterfinal	Semifinal	Final / BM	
Athlete	Event	Opposition Result	Opposition Result	Opposition Result	Opposition Result	Opposition Result	Opposition Result	Rank	Opposition Result	Opposition Result	Opposition Result	Opposition Result	Rank
Katharine Holmes	Girls’ épée	Rahardja (SIN); W 5–3	Jaqman (PLE); W 5–0	Lin (CHN); L 1–5	Santuccio (ITA); W 3–2	Swatowska (POL); W 4–3	Brunner (SUI); W 5–1	2	Bye	Tataran (ROU); W 15–10	Santuccio (ITA); L 8–9	Bronze final Swatowska (POL); L 9–15	4
Mona Shaito	Girls’ foil	Jaoude (LIB); W 5–0	Goldie (CAN); L 2–5	Alekseeva (RUS); W 5–3	Daw (EGY); W 5–1	Ndao (SEN); W 5–0	Mancini (ITA); L 4–5	4	Ndao (SEN); W 15–1	Mancini (ITA); L 10–15	Did not advance		5
Celina Merza	Girls’ sabre	Wan (CHN); W 5–3	Nyabileke (COD); W 5–0	Musch (GER); W 5–2	Hilwiyah (IRQ); W 5–0	Wator (POL); W 5–1	Komaschuk (UKR); L 4–5	1	Bye	Ahmed (EGY); W 15–4	Musch (GER); W 15–10	Egoryan (RUS); L 8–15	2nd place, silver medalist(s)

Mixed

Athlete	Event	Round of 16	Quarterfinal	Semifinal	Final / BM	
Athlete	Event	Opposition Result	Opposition Result	Opposition Result	Opposition Result	Rank
Americas 1 Alanna Goldie (CAN); Katharine Holmes; Alexandre Lyssov (CAN); Alexander Massialas; Celina Merza; Will Spear	Mixed team	Bye	Europe 3 W 30–28	Europe 1 L 25–30	Bronze final Asia-Oceania 1 W 30–24	3rd place, bronze medalist(s)
Americas 2 Miguel Breault-Mallette (CAN); Maria Carreno (VEN); Clara Isabel Di Tella (ARG); Guilherme Melaragno (BRA); Redys Prades Rosabal (CUB); Mona Shaito	Mixed team	Africa; W 28–25	Europe 1 L 17–30	5th-8th Europe 3 L 23–30	7th-8th Asia-Oceania 2 W 28–27	7

== Gymnastics ==
=== Artistic Gymnastics ===
Boys

Athlete	Event	Qualification								Final							
Athlete	Event	Apparatus						Total	Rank	Apparatus						Total	Final
Athlete	Event	F	PH	R	V	PB	HB	Total	Rank	F	PH	R	V	PB	HB	Total	Final
Jesse Glenn	Individual all-around	13.800	11.750	14.000 Q	15.650	12.300	13.150	80.650	20	Did not advance							
Jesse Glenn	Rings	—N/a								—N/a		13.375	—N/a				8

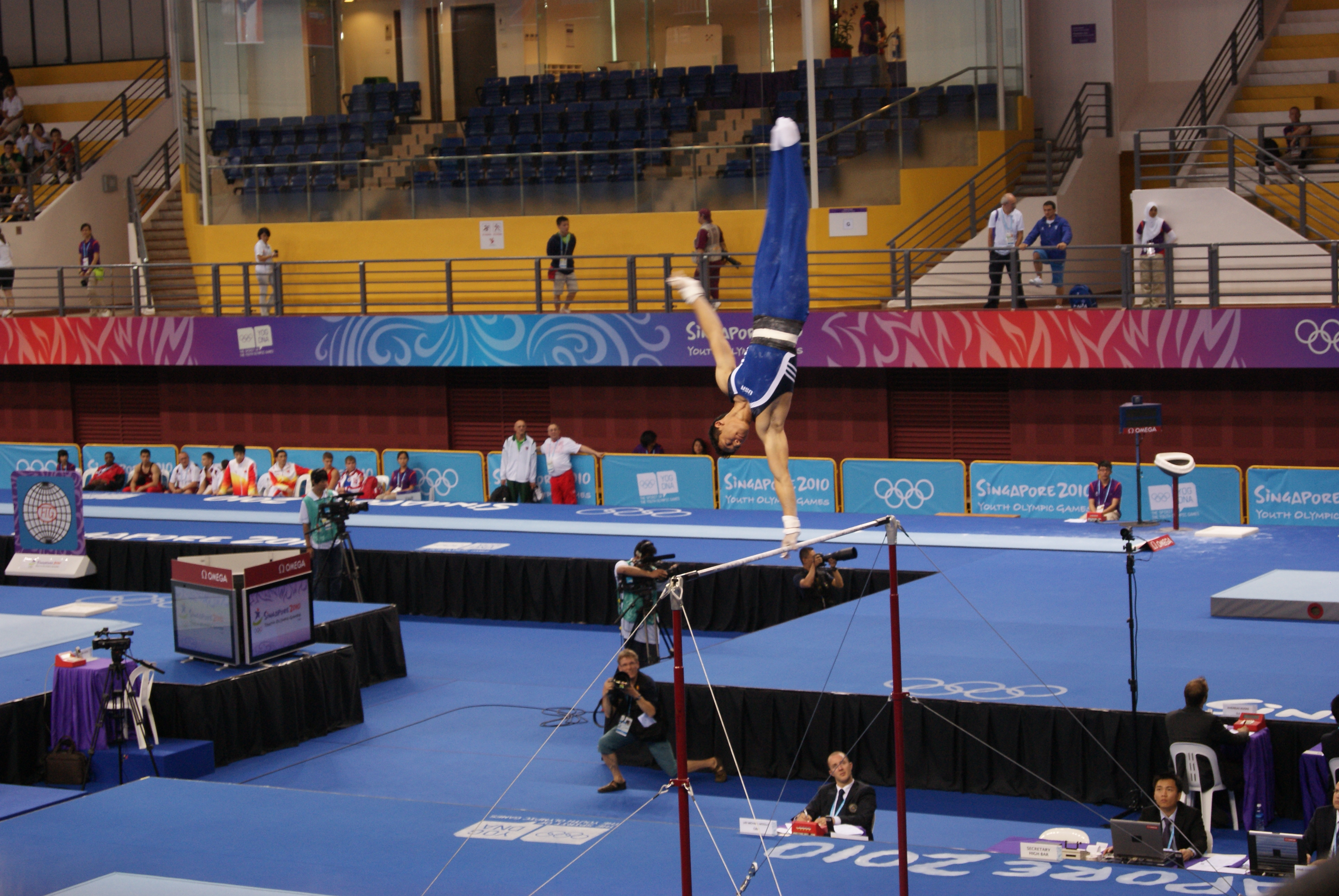
Gymnast Jesse Glenn on the horizontal bar during the artistic gymnastics competition on 16 August 2010 at Bishan Sports Hall, Singapore

=== Rhythmic Gymnastics ===
Athlete	Event	Qualification						Final					
Athlete	Event	Rope	Hoop	Ball	Clubs	Total	Rank	Rope	Hoop	Ball	Clubs	Total	Rank
Polina Kozitskiy	Individual all-around	23.475	23.475	22.325	22.700	91.975	8 Q	22.900	23.050	23.100	23.075	92.125	7

=== Trampoline ===
Athlete	Event	Qualification				Final	
Athlete	Event	Routine 1	Routine 2	Total	Rank	Score	Rank
Hunter Brewster	Boys'	26.100	7.600	33.700	11	Did not advance	
Savannah Vinsant	Girls'	27.200	37.400	64.600	2 Q	33.500	5

== Judo ==
Athlete	Event	Round 1	Round 2	Quarterfinal	Semifinal	Repechage 1	Repechage 2	Repechage 3	Repechage 4	Final / BM	
Athlete	Event	Opposition Result	Opposition Result	Opposition Result	Opposition Result	Opposition Result	Opposition Result	Opposition Result	Opposition Result	Opposition Result	Rank
Max Schneider	Boys' –66 kg	Bye	Ghasemi Asl (IRI); W 022–000	Jalilov (AZE); W 111–000	Ghazaryan (ARM); W 101–000	Bye				Hyon (PRK); W 100–000	1st place, gold medalist(s)
Katelyn Bouyssou	Girls' –52 kg	—N/a	Giuffrida (ITA); W 000–011	Pop (ROU); W 020–000	Huck (AUT); W 101–000	Bye			—N/a	Dmitrieva (RUS); W 021–000	1st place, gold medalist(s)
Barcelona; Michael Greiter (AUT); Gulnoza Matniyazova (UZB); Natalia Rak (EST); Julia Rosso-Richetto (FRA); Maxamillian Schneider; Bolot Toktogonov (KGZ); Subash Yadav (IND); Yu-Chun Wu (TPE)	Mixed team	—N/a	Osaka; L 3–5	Did not advance		—N/a				Did not advance	9
New York; Dmytro Atanov (UKR); Julanda Bacaj (ALB); Katelyn Bouyssou; Mateja Glusac (SRB); Dilara Incedayi (TUR); Matheus Marcia Machado (BRA); Ghenadie Pretivatii (MDA); Milica Savic (BIH)	Mixed team	—N/a	Bye	Tokyo; L 4^{2}–4^{3}	Did not advance	—N/a				Did not advance	5

== Modern pentathlon ==
Athlete	Event	Fencing (épée one touch)			Swimming (200 m freestyle)			Combined: shooting/running (laser pistol)/(3000 m)			Total Points	Final Rank
Athlete	Event	RR	Rank	MP Points	Time	Rank	MP Points	Time	Rank	MP Points	Total Points	Final Rank
Nathan Schrimsher	Boys'	12–11	=7	840	2:08.31	9	1264	12:02.95	17	2112	4216	13
Anna Olesinski	Girls'	14–9	8	920	2:27.69	18	1028	12:21.48	3	2036	3984	4
Han Jiahao (CHN); Anna Olesinski	Mixed relay	46–46	11	820	2:04.24	9	1312	15:34.18	6	2344	4476	7
Leydi Laura Moya Lopez (CUB); Nathan Schrimsher	Mixed relay	38–54	20	740	2:03.98	7	1316	16:33.21	17	2108	4164	16

== Sailing ==
Note: Races 11-15 were cancelled.

Athlete	Event	Race											Net Points	Final Rank
Athlete	Event	1	2	3	4	5	6	7	8	9	10	M*	Net Points	Final Rank
Ian Stokes	Boys' Techno 293	~~OCS (22)~~	20	15	12	19	14	17	15	18	18	21	169	20
Margot Samson	Girls' Techno 293	16	16	14	16	16	10	15	15	17	~~DNS (19)~~	14	149	16

== Swimming ==
Boys

Athlete	Event	Heat		Semifinal		Final	
Athlete	Event	Time	Rank	Time	Rank	Time	Rank
Erich Peske	50 m freestyle	23.52	7 Q	23.56	11	Did not advance	
Thomas Stephens	100 m freestyle	52.20	21	Did not advance			
Steve Schmuhl	200 m freestyle	1:53.81	17	—N/a		Did not advance	
Thomas Stephens	200 m freestyle	1:52.35	11	—N/a		Did not advance	
Thomas Stephens	400 m freestyle	4:02.11	12	—N/a		Did not advance	
Steve Schmuhl	100 m backstroke	58.01	13 Q	57.64	12	Did not advance	
Austin Ringquist	200 m backstroke	2:05.36	8 Q	—N/a		2:04.85	7
Erich Peske	100 m butterfly	54.50	3 Q	54.29	6 Q	54.93	8
Erich Peske	200 m butterfly	2:05.09	13	—N/a		Did not advance	
Austin Ringquist	200 m individual medley	2:06.51	14	—N/a		Did not advance	
Erich Peske; Austin Ringquist; Steve Schmuhl; Thomas Stephens	4 × 100 m freestyle relay	3:27.11	3 Q	—N/a		3:25.56	5
Erich Peske; Austin Ringquist; Steve Schmuhl; Thomas Stephens	4 × 100 m medley relay	3:52.98	11	—N/a		Did not advance	

Girls

Athlete	Event	Heat		Semifinal		Final	
Athlete	Event	Time	Rank	Time	Rank	Time	Rank
Kiera Janzen	50 m freestyle	27.93	27	Did not advance			
Jordan Mattern	100 m freestyle	57.81	10 Q	57.36	8 Q	57.52	7
Kiera Janzen	200 m freestyle	2:02.09	1 Q	—N/a		2:02.01	4
Jordan Mattern	200 m freestyle	2:02.91	4 Q	—N/a		2:03.28	7
Kiera Janzen	400 m freestyle	4:18.36	4 Q	—N/a		4:14.28	2nd place, silver medalist(s)
Jordan Mattern	400 m freestyle	4:19.51	7 Q	—N/a		4:14.94	6
Allison Roberts	100 m backstroke	1:04.53	8 Q	1:04.55	10	Did not advance	
Kaitlyn Jones	200 m backstroke	2:13.46	1 Q	—N/a		2:12.20	2nd place, silver medalist(s)
Allison Roberts	200 m backstroke	2:17.29	9	—N/a		Did not advance	
Kaitlyn Jones	200 m individual medley	2:16.57	2 Q	—N/a		2:14.53	1st place, gold medalist(s)
Jordan Mattern	200 m individual medley	2:19.55	6 Q	—N/a		2:19.70	6
Kiera Janzen; Kaitlyn Jones; Jordan Mattern; Allison Roberts	4 × 100 m freestyle relay	3:56.12	6 Q	—N/a		3:54.26	6
Kiera Janzen; Kaitlyn Jones; Jordan Mattern; Allison Roberts	4 × 100 m medley relay	4:26.15	9	—N/a		Did not advance	

Mixed

Athlete	Event	Heat		Final	
Athlete	Event	Time	Rank	Time	Rank
Kiera Janzen; Jordan Mattern; Erich Peske; Thomas Stephens	4 × 100 m freestyle relay	3:38.89	5 Q	3:39.08	6
Kaitlyn Jones; Jordan Mattern; Erich Peske; Austin Ringquist	4 × 100 m medley relay	4:04.29	7 Q	4:02.90	6

== Taekwondo ==
Athlete	Event	Preliminary	Quarterfinal	Semifinal	Final	
Athlete	Event	Oppsosition Result	Oppsosition Result	Oppsosition Result	Oppsosition Result	Rank
Gregory English	Boys' -48kg	—N/a	Gökmen (GER); W 4–1	Soleimami (IRI); L 1–3	Did not advance	3rd place, bronze medalist(s)
Jessie Bates	Girls' -49kg	Kim (KOR); W 9–6	Wangmo (BHU); W RSC	Touran (JOR); L 1–2	Did not advance	3rd place, bronze medalist(s)
Adrienne Ivey	Girls' +63kg	Bye	Zheng (CHN); L 0–1 (PTF)	Did not advance		

== Table tennis ==
Athlete	Event	Round 1				Round 2 / Consolation round				Round of 16	Quarterfinal	Semifinal	Final	
Athlete	Event	Opposition Result	Opposition Result	Opposition Result	Rank	Opposition Result	Opposition Result	Opposition Result	Rank	Opposition Result	Opposition Result	Opposition Result	Opposition Result	Rank
Ariel Hsing	Girls' singles	Cordero (PUR); W 3-0 (11-8, 11-9, 11-6)	Ng (HKG); L 2-3 (11-9, 7-11, 11-7, 9-11, 3-11)	Vithanage (SRI); W 3-1 (11-9, 11-5, 6-11, 11-9)	2 Q	Jeger (CRO); W 3-2 (11-7, 11-7, 5-11, 12-14, 11-7)	Li (SIN); L 1-3 (12-10, 5-11, 4-11, 9-11)	Yang (KOR); L 0-3 (8-11, 11-13, 6-11)	3	—N/a	Did not advance			9
Pan America 1 Axel Gavilan (PAR); Ariel Hsing	Mixed team	Bye	Niwa / Tanioka (JPN); L 0-3 (2-3, 0-3, 0-3)	Jouti / Kumahara (BRA); L 1-2 (1-3, 3-1, 2-3)	3	Africa 1 Laid (ALG) / Onaolapo (NGR); W 2-0 (w/o)	Europe 6 Galic (SLO) / Leitgeb (AUT); L 0-2 (2-3, 1-3)	—N/a		Did not advance				21

== Triathlon ==
Individual

Athlete	Event	Time						Rank
Athlete	Event	Swim (750 m)	Trans 1	Bike (20 km)	Trans 2	Run (5 km)	Total	Rank
Kevin McDowell	Boys'	8:54	0:27	28:31	0:22	16:41	54:55.28	2nd place, silver medalist(s)
Kelly Whitley	Girls'	10:13	0:33	31:31	0:25	18:31	1:01:13.49	3rd place, bronze medalist(s)

Relay

Athlete	Event	Total time	Rank
Athlete	Event	Swim (250 m), Bike (7 km), Run (1.7 km)	Rank
Adriana Barraza (MEX)	Mixed team relay	21:44	—N/a
Lautaro Diaz (ARG)	Mixed team relay	19:23	—N/a
Kevin McDowell	Mixed team relay	18:29	—N/a
Kelly Whitley	Mixed team relay	20:22	—N/a
Americas 1	Mixed team relay	1:19:58.88	3rd place, bronze medalist(s)

== Volleyball ==
Summary

Squad list	Event	Preliminary round			Semifinal	Final / BM	
Squad list	Event	Opposition Result	Opposition Result	Rank	Opposition Result	Opposition Result	Rank
Samantha Cash (C); Crystal Graff; Micha Hancock; Natalie Hayes; Christina Higgins; Madison Kamp; Elizabeth McMahon; Katie Mitchell; Tiffany Morales; Olivia Okoro; Taylor Simpson; Lauren Teknipp	Girls' tournament	Belgium; W 3–2	Egypt; W 3–0	1	Japan; W 3–0	Belgium; L 1–3	2nd place, silver medalist(s)

Preliminary round

Pos	Team	Pld	W	L	Pts	SW	SL	SR	SPW	SPL	SPR
1	United States	2	2	0	4	6	2	3.000	173	163	1.061
2	Belgium	2	1	1	3	5	3	1.667	178	131	1.359
3	Egypt	2	0	2	2	0	6	0.000	93	150	0.620

August 22, 2010; 18:00	United States	3–2	Belgium	Toa Payoh Sports Hall; Attendance: 1,500; Referees: Sammi Yoko (Japan), Ho Yen Kwong (Singapore)
August 22, 2010; 18:00	(25–22, 15–25, 25–20, 18–25, 15–11)			Toa Payoh Sports Hall; Attendance: 1,500; Referees: Sammi Yoko (Japan), Ho Yen Kwong (Singapore)

August 23, 2010; 15:30	Egypt	0–3	United States	Toa Payoh Sports Hall; Attendance: 1,200; Referees: Prasertsak Boonsiriroj (Thailand), Lourdes Perez Perez (Cuba)
August 23, 2010; 15:30	(18–25, 19–25, 23–25)			Toa Payoh Sports Hall; Attendance: 1,200; Referees: Prasertsak Boonsiriroj (Thailand), Lourdes Perez Perez (Cuba)

August 24, 2010; 18:00	United States	3–0	Japan	Toa Payoh Sports Hall; Attendance: 1,500; Referees: Fathi Bouhouch (Tunisia), Yanick Chaladay (France)
August 24, 2010; 18:00	(25–20, 25–23, 25–23)			Toa Payoh Sports Hall; Attendance: 1,500; Referees: Fathi Bouhouch (Tunisia), Yanick Chaladay (France)

Gold medal match

August 26, 2010; 9:00	Belgium	3–1	United States	Toa Payoh Sports Hall; Attendance: 2,000; Referees: Wang Hao Juan (China), Sammi Yoko (Japan)
August 26, 2010; 9:00	(17–25, 25–20, 25–18, 25–12)			Toa Payoh Sports Hall; Attendance: 2,000; Referees: Wang Hao Juan (China), Sammi Yoko (Japan)

== Weightlifting ==
Athlete	Event	Snatch		Clean & Jerk		Total	
Athlete	Event	Weight	Rank	Weight	Rank	Weight	Rank
Jessica Beed	Girls' 63kg	75	6	90	7	165	7

== Wrestling ==
Key:

- VT - Victory by Fall.
- PP - Decision by Points - the loser with technical points.
- PO - Decision by Points - the loser without technical points.

Athlete	Event	Group stage				Final / BM / Pl.	
Athlete	Event	Opposition Result	Opposition Result	Opposition Result	Rank	Opposition Result	Rank
Quinton Murphy	Boys' freestyle 63kg	Pereira (GBS); W 4–0^{VT}	Boudraa (ALG); W 4–0^{VT}	Kadirov (TJK); L 1–3^{PP}	2	3rd place match Mosidze (GEO); L 1–3^{PP}	4
Jordan Rogers	Boys' freestyle 76kg	Kouagou (BEN); W 4–0^{VT}	Ali (EGY); W 3–1^{PP}	Aguon (GUM); W 4–0^{VT}	1	Kalayci (TUR); L 0–4^{VT}	2nd place, silver medalist(s)
Lucas Sheridan	Boys' Greco-Roman 85kg	Mweia (SOL); W 4–0^{VT}	Abdelwahab (EGY); L 1–3^{PP}	Al-Abedi (IRQ); W 4–0^{VT}	2	3rd place match Kamilov (UZB); L 1–3^{PP}	4
Jenna Rose Burkert	Girls' 60kg	Dhanda (IND); L 0–3^{PO}	Ahmed (BUL); L 0–3^{PO}	Puteri (SIN); W 4–0^{VT}	3	5th place match Victor (NGR); W 3–1^{PP}	5
