= Swimming at the 2010 Summer Youth Olympics – Girls' 100 metre freestyle =

The girls' 100 metre freestyle event at the 2010 Youth Olympic Games took place on August 16 and the final on August 17, at the Singapore Sports School.

== Medalists ==
Gold	Tang Yi; China	54.46
Silver	Emma McKeon; Australia	55.37
Bronze	Lauren Earp; Canada	56.59

== Heats ==
=== Heat 1 ===
Rank	Lane	Name	Nationality	Time	Notes
1	6	Zeineb Khalfallah	Tunisia	58.37	Q
2	1	Bieliukas Trejo Oriana	Venezuela	58.90	
3	5	Bria Deveaux	Bahamas	1:01.17	
4	2	Maria Lopez	Bolivia	1:04.86	
5	7	Arhatha Magavi	India	1:05.18	
6	8	Madhawee Weerathunga	Sri Lanka	1:05.38	
7	3	Aina Filsrabetsara	Madagascar	1:06.73	
	4	Josephine Blamo	Liberia		DNS

=== Heat 2 ===
Rank	Lane	Name	Nationality	Time	Notes
1	4	Sara Hayajna	Jordan	1:01.08	
2	5	Katriin Kersa	Estonia	1:01.13	
3	3	Dayana Castro	Costa Rica	1:01.65	
4	6	Angélique Trinquier	Monaco	1:05.04	
5	2	Maria Gibbons	Palau	1:11.34	
6	8	Zeynab Ba	Senegal	1:12.66	
7	7	Jennet Saryyeva	Turkmenistan	1:14.28	
8	1	Aminath Shajan	Maldives	1:15.25	

=== Heat 3 ===
Rank	Lane	Name	Nationality	Time	Notes
1	2	Patricia Hapsari	Indonesia	58.85	
2	5	Gizem Bozkurt	Turkey	59.05	
3	6	Raissa Andrea Guerra	Uruguay	59.70	
4	3	Karen Sif Vilhjalmsdotter	Iceland	1:00.01	
5	1	Bayan Jumah	Syria	1:00.07	
6	4	Kimberlee John-Williams	Trinidad and Tobago	1:00.15	
7	8	Tiana Tasevska	Macedonia	1:01.04	
8	7	Simona Marinova	Macedonia	1:01.21	

=== Heat 4 ===
Rank	Lane	Name	Nationality	Time	Notes
1	2	Aksana Dziamidava	Belarus	58.22	Q
2	3	Lotta Nevalainen	Finland	58.46	
3	4	Ingibjorg Kristin Jonsdottir	Iceland	58.74	
4	5	Kyla Ferreira	South Africa	59.20	
5	7	Sarah Rolko	Luxembourg	59.56	
6	1	Shahd Mostafa	Egypt	1:00.42	
7	8	Adeline Winata	Singapore	1:00.64	
8	6	Hristina Muncheva	Bulgaria	1:01.51	

=== Heat 5 ===
Rank	Lane	Name	Nationality	Time	Notes
1	5	Lauren Earp	Canada	57.09	Q
2	7	Sarah Wegria	Belgium	57.55	Q
3	6	Danielle Villars	Switzerland	57.59	Q
4	2	Nicol Samsonyk	Israel	58.02	Q
5	4	Amanda Lim	Singapore	58.03	Q
6	8	Cheyenne Pigot	Suriname	58.66	
7	1	Tam Nguyen Tran	Vietnam	59.39	
8	3	Mathilde Cini	France	59.43	

=== Heat 6 ===
Rank	Lane	Name	Nationality	Time	Notes
1	6	Emma McKeon	Australia	56.04	Q
2	5	Alessandra Marchioro	Brazil	56.74	Q
3	4	Juliane Reinhold	Germany	57.71	Q
4	1	Natalia Pawlaczek	Poland	58.29	Q
5	3	Isabella Arcila	Colombia	58.49	
6	8	Manon Minneboo	Netherlands	58.77	
7	2	Chloe Francis	New Zealand	58.84	
8	7	Maria Carolina da Costa Rosa	Portugal	59.45	

=== Heat 7 ===
Rank	Lane	Name	Nationality	Time	Notes
1	4	Tang Yi	China	57.22	Q
2	3	Katarina Listopadova	Slovakia	57.35	Q
3	5	Agnes Bucz	Hungary	57.70	Q
4	7	Jordan Mattern	United States	57.81	Q
5	2	Jasmine Alkhaldi	Philippines	58.16	Q
6	1	Eleanor Faulkner	Great Britain	58.71	
7	6	Juanita Barreto	Colombia	59.45	
	8	Elena di Liddo	Italy		DNS

== Semifinals ==
=== Semifinal 1 ===
Rank	Lane	Name	Nationality	Time	Notes
1	5	Tang Yi	China	56.22	Q
2	4	Alessandra Marchioro	Brazil	56.82	Q
3	6	Agnes Bucz	Hungary	56.97	Q
4	2	Jordan Mattern	United States	57.36	Q
5	1	Aksana Dziamidava	Belarus	57.49	
6	7	Amanda Lim	Singapore	57.99	
7	8	Zeineb Khalfallah	Tunisia	58.12	
8	3	Sarah Wegria	Belgium	58.23	

=== Semifinal 2 ===
Rank	Lane	Name	Nationality	Time	Notes
1	4	Emma McKeon	Australia	55.64	Q
2	3	Katarina Listopadova	Slovakia	56.67	Q
3	5	Lauren Earp	Canada	56.79	Q
4	6	Danielle Villars	Switzerland	57.22	Q
5	2	Juliane Reinhold	Germany	57.64	
6	1	Jasmine Alkhaldi	Philippines	58.01	
7	7	Nicol Samsonyk	Israel	58.18	
8	8	Natalia Pawlaczek	Poland	58.40	

== Final ==
Rank	Lane	Name	Nationality	Time	Notes
1st place, gold medalist(s)	5	Tang Yi	China	54.46	
2nd place, silver medalist(s)	4	Emma McKeon	Australia	55.37	
3rd place, bronze medalist(s)	6	Lauren Earp	Canada	56.59	
4	3	Katarina Listopadova	Slovakia	56.90	
5	2	Alessandra Marchioro	Brazil	57.12	
6	7	Agnes Bucz	Hungary	57.40	
7	8	Jordan Mattern	United States	57.52	
8	1	Danielle Villars	Switzerland	57.72	
