= Swimming at the 2010 Summer Youth Olympics – Girls' 50 metre backstroke =

The girls' 50 metre backstroke event at the 2010 Youth Olympic Games took place on August 18–19, at the Singapore Sports School.

== Medalists ==
Gold	Mathilde Cini; France	29.19
Silver	Daryna Zevina; Ukraine	29.34
Bronze	Alexandra Papusha; Russia	29.51

== Heats ==
=== Heat 1 ===
Rank	Lane	Name	Nationality	Time	Notes
1	5	Alexandra Papusha	Russia	29.64	Q
2	6	Isabella Arcila	Colombia	30.05	Q
3	4	Klaudia Nazieblo	Poland	30.07	Q
4	3	Siona Huxley	Saint Lucia	30.86	Q
5	2	Kendese Nangle	Jamaica	31.09	Q
6	8	Amel Melih	Algeria	31.75	Q
7	7	Sylvia Tanya Atieno	Kenya	32.90	
8	1	Yanet Gebremedhin	Ethiopia	38.96	

=== Heat 2 ===
Rank	Lane	Name	Nationality	Time	Notes
1	4	Daryna Zevina	Ukraine	29.79	Q
2	5	Sarah Rolko	Luxembourg	30.26	Q
3	6	Lotta Nevalainen	Finland	30.32	Q
4	3	Juanita Barreto	Colombia	30.48	Q
5	2	Monica Ramirez Abella	Andorra	30.80	Q
6	7	Anahit Barseghyan	Armenia	32.79	
7	1	Rohane Crichton	Samoa	35.30	

=== Heat 3 ===
Rank	Lane	Name	Nationality	Time	Notes
1	3	Mathilde Cini	France	29.70	Q
2	5	Lovisa Eriksson	Sweden	29.71	Q
3	4	Yekaterina Rudenko	Kazakhstan	30.75	Q
4	2	Ting Chen	Chinese Taipei	30.88	Q
5	7	Adeline Winata	Singapore	31.43	Q
6	1	Karlene Theodora	Netherlands Antilles	33.03	
7	6	Daoheuang Inthavong	Laos	41.22	

== Semifinals ==
=== Semifinal 1 ===
Rank	Lane	Name	Nationality	Time	Notes
1	4	Mathilde Cini	France	29.22	Q
2	5	Daryna Zevina	Ukraine	29.51	Q
3	3	Klaudia Nazieblo	Poland	29.91	Q
4	2	Yekaterina Rudenko	Kazakhstan	30.09	Q
5	6	Lotta Nevalainen	Finland	30.22	Q
6	1	Kendese Nangle	Jamaica	30.91	
7	7	Siona Huxley	Saint Lucia	30.98	
8	8	Amel Melih	Algeria	31.82	

=== Semifinal 2 ===
Rank	Lane	Name	Nationality	Time	Notes
1	4	Alexandra Papusha	Russia	29.55	Q
2	5	Lovisa Eriksson	Sweden	29.82	Q
3	6	Sarah Rolko	Luxembourg	30.35	Q
4	3	Isabella Arcila	Colombia	30.42	SUB
5	2	Juanita Barreto	Colombia	30.76	
6	7	Monica Ramirez Abella	Andorra	30.82	
7	1	Ting Chen	Chinese Taipei	31.03	
8	8	Adeline Winata	Singapore	31.48	

== Final ==
Lovisa Eriksson (SWE) dropped out and was replaced by Isabella Arcila (COL).

Rank	Lane	Name	Nationality	Time	Notes
1st place, gold medalist(s)	4	Mathilde Cini	France	29.19	
2nd place, silver medalist(s)	5	Daryna Zevina	Ukraine	29.34	
3rd place, bronze medalist(s)	3	Alexandra Papusha	Russia	29.51	
4	6	Klaudia Nazieblo	Poland	29.57	
5	2	Yekaterina Rudenko	Kazakhstan	29.65	
6	1	Sarah Rolka	Luxembourg	30.17	
7	8	Isabella Arcila	Colombia	30.31	
8	7	Lotta Nevalainen	Finland	30.35	
