= Swimming at the 2010 Summer Youth Olympics – Boys' 100 metre backstroke =

Swimming competition

The men's 100 metre backstroke heats and semifinals at the 2010 Youth Olympic Games took place on August 15 and the final took place on August 16 at the Singapore Sports School.

== Medalists ==
Gold	He Jianbin; China	55.16
Silver	Yakov Toumarkin; Israel	55.28
Bronze	Lavrans Solli; Norway	56.20

== Heats ==
=== Heat 1 ===
Rank	Lane	Name	Nationality	Time	Notes
1	5	Bastien Soret	Belgium	59.15	
2	2	Ruslan Baimanov	Kazakhstan	1:00.07	
3	4	Bilal Achalhi	Morocco	1:01.70	
4	3	Alan Wladimir Abarca Cortes	Chile	1:01.71	
5	6	Mark Sammut	Malta	1:01.80	
-	7	Ammar Ghanim	Yemen	-	DNS

=== Heat 2 ===
Rank	Lane	Name	Nationality	Time	Notes
1	3	Max Ackermann	Australia	57.64	Q
2	4	Andrii Kovbasa	Ukraine	57.96	Q
3	5	Matuesz Wysoczynski	Poland	58.00	Q
4	2	Raphaël Stacchiotti	Luxembourg	58.11	Q
5	1	Serghei Golban	Moldova	58.12	Q
6	6	Yusuke Yamagishi	Japan	58.97	
7	7	Pedro Antonio Costa	Brazil	59.46	
8	8	Heshan Unamboowe	Sri Lanka	59.75	

=== Heat 3 ===
Rank	Lane	Name	Nationality	Time	Notes
1	5	Yakov Toumarkin	Israel	55.55	Q
2	1	Péter Bernek	Hungary	57.10	Q
3	7	Ivan Biondić	Croatia	57.34	Q
4	6	Alexis Manacas da Silva Santos	Portugal	57.45	Q
5	3	Rainer Kai Wee Ng	Singapore	57.50	Q
6	4	Christian Diener	Germany	58.92	
7	8	Christian Homer	Trinidad and Tobago	59.71	
8	2	Martin Fakla	Slovakia	1:00.06	

=== Heat 4 ===
Rank	Lane	Name	Nationality	Time	Notes
1	3	Lavrans Solli	Norway	57.08	Q
2	4	Jianbin He	China	57.18	Q
3	6	Murray McDougall	South Africa	57.43	Q
4	5	Abdullah Altuwaini	Kuwait	57.88	Q
5	7	Steve Schmuhl	United States	58.01	Q
6	8	Simone Geni	Italy	58.53	
7	1	Ondrej Palatka	Czech Republic	58.86	
8	2	Mans Hjelm	Sweden	59.08	

== Semifinal ==
=== Semifinal 1 ===
Rank	Lane	Name	Nationality	Time	Notes
1	5	Jianbin He	China	56.10	Q
2	4	Lavrans Solli	Norway	56.39	Q
3	3	Murray McDougall	South Africa	56.67	Q
4	2	Abdullah Altuwaini	Kuwait	57.41	Q
5	6	Rainer Kai Wee Ng	Singapore	57.44	
6	7	Matuesz Wysoczynski	Poland	57.56	
7	1	Raphaël Stacchiotti	Luxembourg	57.66	
8	8	Ondrej Palatka	Czech Republic	58.17	

=== Semifinal 2 ===
Rank	Lane	Name	Nationality	Time	Notes
1	4	Yakov Toumarkin	Israel	55.40	Q
2	5	Péter Bernek	Hungary	56.97	Q
3	3	Ivan Biondić	Croatia	57.33	Q
4	7	Andrii Kovbasa	Ukraine	57.35	Q
5	2	Max Ackermann	Australia	57.63	
6	1	Steve Schmuhl	United States	57.64	
7	8	Serghei Golban	Moldova	57.87	
8	6	Alexis Manacas da Silva Santos	Portugal	58.06	

== Final ==
Rank	Lane	Name	Nationality	Time	Notes
1st place, gold medalist(s)	5	Jianbin He	China	55.16	
2nd place, silver medalist(s)	4	Yakov Toumarkin	Israel	55.28	
3rd place, bronze medalist(s)	3	Lavrans Solli	Norway	56.20	
4	2	Péter Bernek	Hungary	56.33	
5	6	Murray McDougall	South Africa	56.68	
6	7	Ivan Biondić	Croatia	56.88	
7	1	Andrii Kovbasa	Ukraine	56.93	
-	8	Abdullah Altuwaini	Kuwait	-	DSQ
