= Swimming at the 2010 Summer Youth Olympics – Boys' 200 metre freestyle =

The boys' 200 metre freestyle event at the 2010 Youth Olympic Games took place on August 16, at the Singapore Sports School.

== Medalists ==
| Gold | Andrey Ushakov; Russia | 1:49.81 |
| Silver | Cristian Quintero; Venezuela | 1:49.98 |
| Bronze | Jeremy Bagshaw; Canada | 1:50.67 |

== Heats ==
=== Heat 1 ===
| Rank | Lane | Name | Nationality | Time | Notes |
|---|---|---|---|---|---|
| 1 | 7 | Cristian Quintero | Venezuela | 1:50.93 | Q |
| 2 | 2 | Fedy Hannachi | Tunisia | 1:58.64 | |
| 3 | 4 | Jorge Masson | Ecuador | 1:59.08 | |
| 4 | 3 | Jean Marie Froget | Mauritius | 2:02.98 | |
| 5 | 5 | Henk Lowe | Guyana | 2:23.43 | |
| | 6 | Benjamin Gabbard | American Samoa | | DNS |

=== Heat 2 ===
| Rank | Lane | Name | Nationality | Time | Notes |
|---|---|---|---|---|---|
| 1 | 4 | Kar Meng Kevin Lim | Malaysia | 1:55.96 | |
| 2 | 7 | Allan Gabriell Castro | Honduras | 1:56.84 | |
| 3 | 5 | Arren Quek | Singapore | 1:57.62 | |
| 4 | 1 | Kevin Avila Soto | Guatemala | 1:57.73 | |
| 5 | 2 | Anton Sveinn McKee | Iceland | 1:58.08 | |
| 6 | 6 | Hazem Tashkandi | Saudi Arabia | 1:58.56 | |
| 7 | 3 | Quinton Delie | Namibia | 1:59.83 | |
| 8 | 8 | Oriol Cunat Rodriguez | Andorra | 2:01.38 | |

=== Heat 3 ===
| Rank | Lane | Name | Nationality | Time | Notes |
|---|---|---|---|---|---|
| 1 | 3 | Matthew Stanley | New Zealand | 1:51.21 | Q |
| 2 | 1 | Bertung Coskun | Turkey | 1:53.08 | |
| 3 | 5 | Gustavo Manuel Silva Santa | Portugal | 1:55.69 | |
| 4 | 4 | Sebastian Arispe | Peru | 1:55.95 | |
| 5 | 7 | Yaraslau Pronin | Belarus | 1:56.30 | |
| 6 | 6 | Aleksej Kostomaj | Slovenia | 1:57.42 | |
| 7 | 2 | Pavol Jelenak | Slovakia | 1:57.82 | |
| 8 | 8 | Amr Mohamed | Egypt | 1:59.48 | |

=== Heat 4 ===
| Rank | Lane | Name | Nationality | Time | Notes |
|---|---|---|---|---|---|
| 1 | 3 | Andrey Ushakov | Russia | 1:50.34 | Q |
| 2 | 2 | Chad Bobrosky | Canada | 1:51.36 | Q |
| 3 | 7 | Clement Lim | Singapore | 1:52.17 | |
| 4 | 6 | Justin James | Australia | 1:52.51 | |
| 5 | 5 | Victor Rodrigues | Brazil | 1:52.99 | |
| 6 | 1 | Gustav Aberg Lejdstrom | Sweden | 1:54.25 | |
| 7 | 4 | Raphaël Stacchiotti | Luxembourg | 1:55.23 | |
| 8 | 8 | Kevin Leithold | Germany | 1:55.46 | |

=== Heat 5 ===
| Rank | Lane | Name | Nationality | Time | Notes |
|---|---|---|---|---|---|
| 1 | 4 | Dai Jun | China | 1:51.42 | Q |
| 2 | 2 | Jeremy Bagshaw | Canada | 1:51.42 | Q |
| 3 | 3 | Jessie Lacuna | Philippines | 1:51.52 | Q |
| 4 | 1 | Dion Dreesens | Netherlands | 1:51.90 | Q |
| 5 | 6 | Yeray Lebon | Spain | 1:53.53 | |
| 6 | 7 | Steve Schmuhl | United States | 1:53.81 | |
| 7 | 8 | Stefan Sorak | Serbia | 1:54.37 | |
| | 5 | Adrian Mantas | Spain | | DNS |

=== Heat 6 ===
| Rank | Lane | Name | Nationality | Time | Notes |
|---|---|---|---|---|---|
| 1 | 1 | Chad le Clos | South Africa | 1:52.10 | |
| 2 | 2 | Thomas Stephens | United States | 1:52.35 | |
| 3 | 5 | Aaron Agnel D'Souza | India | 1:53.35 | |
| 4 | 3 | Alessio Torlai | Italy | 1:54.11 | |
| 5 | 7 | Kin Tat Kent Cheung | Hong Kong | 1:54.15 | |
| 6 | 6 | Pedro Henrique Franca de Souza | Brazil | 1:57.97 | |
| 7 | 4 | Péter Bernek | Hungary | 2:03.01 | |
| | 8 | Abdullah Altuwaini | Kuwait | | DNS |

== Final ==
| Rank | Lane | Athlete | Time | Notes |
|---|---|---|---|---|
| 1st place, gold medalist(s) | 4 | Andrey Ushakov (RUS) | 1:49.81 | |
| 2nd place, silver medalist(s) | 5 | Cristian Quintero (VEN) | 1:49.98 | |
| 3rd place, bronze medalist(s) | 7 | Jeremy Bagshaw (CAN) | 1:50.67 | |
| 4 | 6 | Chad Bobrosky (CAN) | 1:50.86 | |
| 5 | 3 | Matthew Stanley (NZL) | 1:51.59 | |
| 5 | 2 | Dai Jun (CHN) | 1:51.66 | |
| 7 | 8 | Dion Dreesens (NED) | 1:51.76 | |
| 8 | 1 | Jessie Lacuna (PHI) | 1:51.95 | |
