= Swimming at the 2010 Summer Youth Olympics – Boys' 200 metre individual medley =

The men's 200 metre individual medley event at the 2010 Youth Olympic Games took place on August 16, at the Singapore Sports School.

== Medalists ==
Gold	Chad le Clos; South Africa	2:00.68
Silver	Kenneth To; Australia	2:02.51
Bronze	Dylan Bosch; South Africa	2:02.59

== Heats ==
=== Heat 1 ===
Rank	Lane	Name	Nationality	Time	Notes
1	3	Juan Sequera	Venezuela	2:06.64	
2	5	Giorgi Mtvralashvili	Georgia	2:12.70	
3	4	Seiji Groome	Cayman Islands	2:16.84	

=== Heat 2 ===
Rank	Lane	Name	Nationality	Time	Notes
1	4	Alexey Atsapkin	Russia	2:03.69	Q
2	6	Ganesh Pedurand	France	2:04.07	Q
3	3	Jakub Maly	Austria	2:04.76	
4	5	Zsombor Szana	Hungary	2:05.78	
5	1	Dmitriy Shvetsov	Uzbekistan	2:06.94	
6	2	Alexis Manacas da Silva Santos	Portugal	2:08.38	
7	7	Aleksej Koštomaj	Slovenia	2:10.35	

=== Heat 3 ===
Rank	Lane	Name	Nationality	Time	Notes
1	4	Kenneth To	Australia	2:02.42	Q
2	6	Takahiro Tsutsumi	Japan	2:03.73	Q
3	3	Eduardo Solaeche	Spain	2:04.06	Q
4	5	Nuttapong Ketin	Thailand	2:05.62	
5	2	Tatsunari Shoda	Japan	2:08.29	
6	1	Mans Hjelm	Sweden	2:09.81	
7	8	Ahmadreza Jalali	Iran	2:12.43	
-	7	Panagiotis Samilidis	Greece	-	DNS

=== Heat 4 ===
Rank	Lane	Name	Nationality	Time	Notes
1	3	Chad le Clos	South Africa	2:03.12	Q
2	2	Dylan Bosch	South Africa	2:03.20	Q
3	6	Yakov Toumarkin	Israel	2:04.13	Q
4	4	Raphaël Stacchiotti	Luxembourg	2:04.17	
5	5	Simone Geni	Italy	2:04.68	
6	8	Austin Ringquist	United States	2:06.51	
7	7	Sheng Jun Pang	Singapore	2:06.65	
8	1	Bastien Soret	Belgium	2:08.80	

== Final ==
Rank	Lane	Name	Nationality	Time	Notes
1st place, gold medalist(s)	5	Chad le Clos	South Africa	2:00.68	
2nd place, silver medalist(s)	4	Kenneth To	Australia	2:02.51	
3rd place, bronze medalist(s)	3	Dylan Bosch	South Africa	2:02.59	
4	8	Yakov Toumarkin	Israel	2:03.44	
5	6	Alexey Atsapkin	Russia	2:03.66	
6	7	Eduardo Solaeche	Spain	2:04.09	
7	1	Ganesh Pedurand	France	2:04.21	
8	2	Takahiro Tsutsumi	Japan	2:06.18	
