= Honduras at the 2010 Summer Youth Olympics =

- IOC code: HON
- NOC: Comité Olímpico Hondureño

in Singapore
- Competitors: 4 in 3 sports
- Flag bearer: Christhopher Pavon
- Medals: Gold 0 Silver 0 Bronze 0 Total 0

Summer Youth Olympics appearances
- 2010; 2014; 2018; 2026

Honduras participated in the 2010 Summer Youth Olympics in Singapore.

== Medalists ==
Medal	Name	Sport	Event	Date
Bronze	Kevin Fernandez	Judo	Mixed Event	25 Aug

== Judo ==
Individual

Athlete	Event	Round 1	Round 2	Round 3	Semifinals	Final	Rank
Athlete	Event	Opposition Result	Opposition Result	Opposition Result	Opposition Result	Opposition Result	Rank
Kevin Fernandez	Boys' -81 kg	Szakacs (SVK); L 000-100	Repechage; Greiter (AUT); L 000-110	Did not advance			9

Team

Team	Event	Round 1	Round 2	Semifinals	Final	Rank
Team	Event	Opposition Result	Opposition Result	Opposition Result	Opposition Result	Rank
Tokyo; Seul Bi Bae (KOR); Fabio Basile (ITA); Gaelle Nemorin (MRI); Patrik Ferreira Martins (AND); Rotem Shor (ISR); Kevin Fernandez (HON); Kseniya Darchuk (UKR); Batuhan Efemgil (TUR)	Mixed Team	Paris; W 5-3	New York; W 4-4 (3-2)	Belgrade; L 3-5	Did not advance	Bronze medal

== Swimming ==
Athletes	Event	Heat		Semifinal		Final	
Athletes	Event	Time	Position	Time	Position	Time	Position
Allan Gabriell Castro	Boys’ 200m Freestyle	1:56.84	28			Did not advance	
Allan Gabriell Castro	Boys’ 400m Freestyle	4:08.62	22			Did not advance	
Karen Vilorio	Girls’ 200m Backstroke	2:24.36	26			Did not advance	
Karen Vilorio	Girls’ 200m Individual Medley	2:29.42	21			Did not advance	

== Weightlifting ==
Athlete	Event	Snatch	Clean & jerk	Total	Rank
Cristopher Pavon	Boys' 85kg	120	155	275	6
