= Swimming at the 2010 Summer Youth Olympics – Girls' 200 metre backstroke =

The women's 200 metre backstroke heats and final at the 2010 Youth Olympic Games took place on August 17 at the Singapore Sports School.

== Medalists ==
Gold	Anqi Bai; China	2:11.46
Silver	Kaitlyn Jones; United States	2:12.20
Bronze	Daryna Zevina; Ukraine	2:12.31

== Heats ==
=== Heat 1 ===
Rank	Lane	Name	Nationality	Time	Notes
1	4	Yulduz Kuchkarova	Uzbekistan	2:18.69	
2	5	Julia Gerotto	Brazil	2:23.75	
3	6	Karen Vilorio	Honduras	2:24.36	
4	3	Lee-Ann Rose	Barbados	2:25.29	
5	7	Chriselle Koh	Singapore	2:25.81	
6	8	Karla Yolanda Rafaela Toscano Lopez	Guatemala	2:26.23	
7	2	Adeline Winata	Singapore	2:27.49	
8	1	Ayesha Marie Noel	Grenada	2:42.60	

=== Heat 2 ===
Rank	Lane	Name	Nationality	Time	Notes
1	3	Barbora Závadová	Czech Republic	2:14.64	Q
2	4	Klaudia Nazieblo	Poland	2:16.54	Q
3	5	Alexandra Papusha	Russia	2:17.36	
4	2	Mina Ochi	Japan	2:18.26	
5	6	Natasha de Vos	South Africa	2:19.03	
6	8	Danielle Villars	Switzerland	2:19.31	
7	1	Alexandra Dobrin	Romania	2:22.90	
8	7	Madison Wilson	Australia	2:26.76	

=== Heat 3 ===
Rank	Lane	Name	Nationality	Time	Notes
1	4	Daryna Zevina	Ukraine	2:15.12	Q
2	6	Marie Jugnet	France	2:15.53	Q
3	5	Yukiko Watanabe	Japan	2:16.82	Q
4	2	Martina Elhenicka	Czech Republic	2:17.86	
5	7	Juanita Barreto	Colombia	2:18.66	
6	8	Diana Chang	Ecuador	2:21.18	
7	3	Sarah Rolko	Luxembourg	2:21.98	
8	1	Mabel Sulic	Croatia	2:23.36	

=== Heat 4 ===
Rank	Lane	Name	Nationality	Time	Notes
1	6	Kaitlyn Jones	United States	2:13.46	Q
2	4	Anqi Bai	China	2:14.94	Q
3	5	Dörte Baumert	Germany	2:16.43	Q
4	3	Allison Roberts	United States	2:17.29	
5	1	Isabella Arcila	Colombia	2:18.71	
6	8	Renee Stothard	New Zealand	2:20.14	
7	7	Ida Lindborg	Sweden	2:21.26	
8	2	Lourdes Villasenor	Mexico	2:21.77	

== Final ==
Rank	Lane	Name	Nationality	Time	Notes
1st place, gold medalist(s)	3	Anqi Bai	China	2:11.46	
2nd place, silver medalist(s)	4	Kaitlyn Jones	United States	2:12.20	
3rd place, bronze medalist(s)	6	Daryna Zevina	Ukraine	2:12.31	
4	2	Marie Jugnet	France	2:13.60	
5	5	Barbora Závadová	Czech Republic	2:14.16	
6	7	Dörte Baumert	Germany	2:16.15	
7	1	Klaudia Nazieblo	Poland	2:16.45	
8	8	Yukiko Watanabe	Japan	2:18.36	
