= Luxembourg at the 2010 Summer Youth Olympics =

- IOC code: LUX
- NOC: Luxembourgian Olympic and Sporting Committee

in Singapore
- Competitors: 5 in 2 sports
- Flag bearer: Raphaël Stacchiotti
- Medals: Gold 0 Silver 0 Bronze 0 Total 0

Summer Youth Olympics appearances
- 2010; 2014; 2018

Luxembourg participated in the 2010 Summer Youth Olympics in Singapore.

The Luxembourg squad consisted of five athletes competing in two sports: aquatics (swimming) and athletics.

== Athletics ==
=== Girls ===
Track and Road Events

Athletes	Event	Qualification		Final	
Athletes	Event	Result	Rank	Result	Rank
Frederique Hansen	Girls’ 400m	56.34	11 qB	56.35	12

Field Events

Athletes	Event	Qualification		Final	
Athletes	Event	Result	Rank	Result	Rank
Noemie Pleimling	Girls’ Javelin Throw	42.22	11 qB	46.20	10

== Swimming ==
Athletes	Event	Heat		Semifinal		Final	
Athletes	Event	Time	Position	Time	Position	Time	Position
Raphaël Stacchiotti	Boys’ 50m Freestyle	23.98	17	Did not advance			
Raphaël Stacchiotti	Boys’ 100m Freestyle	51.74	11 Q	51.67	12	Did not advance	
Raphaël Stacchiotti	Boys’ 200m Freestyle	1:55.23	22			Did not advance	
Raphaël Stacchiotti	Boys’ 100m Backstroke	58.11	14 Q	57.66	13	Did not advance	
Raphaël Stacchiotti	Boys’ 200m Individual Medley	2:04.17	9			Did not advance	
Sarah Rolko	Girls’ 50m Freestyle	27.45	24	Did not advance			
Sarah Rolko	Girls’ 100m Freestyle	59.56	32	Did not advance			
Sarah Rolko	Girls’ 50m Backstroke	30.26	7 Q	30.35	8 Q	30.17	6
Sarah Rolko	Girls’ 100m Backstroke	1:05.38	17	Did not advance			
Sarah Rolko	Girls’ 200m Backstroke	2:21.98	22			Did not advance	
Aurelie Waltzing	Girls’ 100m Breaststroke	1:14.11	20	Did not advance			
Aurelie Waltzing	Girls’ 200m Breaststroke	2:37.19	10			Did not advance	
