= Shooting at the 2010 Summer Youth Olympics – Girls' 10 metre air rifle =

These are the results of the girls' 10m air rifle event at the 2010 Youth Olympic Games. The competition took place on August 25, with the qualification at 9:00 and the Finals at 12:00.

== Medalists ==
| Gold | Dowon Go; South Korea |
| Silver | Gabriela Vognarova; Czech Republic |
| Bronze | Jasmin Mischler; Switzerland |

== Qualification ==
| Rank | Athlete | Series | | | | Total | X | Shoot-off |
| Rank | Athlete | 1 | 2 | 3 | 4 | Total | X | Shoot-off |
|---|---|---|---|---|---|---|---|---|
| 1 | Yvonne Schlotterbeck (GER) | 100 | 100 | 100 | 99 | 399 | 31 | |
| 2 | Dowon Go (KOR) | 99 | 98 | 100 | 100 | 397 | 32 | |
| 2 | Gabriela Vognarova (CZE) | 99 | 98 | 100 | 100 | 397 | 32 | |
| 4 | Jasmin Mischler (SUI) | 99 | 98 | 98 | 100 | 395 | 30 | |
| 5 | Tanja Perec (CRO) | 100 | 96 | 99 | 98 | 393 | 26 | |
| 6 | Shang Hui Carol Lee (SIN) | 98 | 100 | 98 | 97 | 393 | 24 | |
| 7 | Neha Milind Sapte (IND) | 99 | 97 | 98 | 98 | 392 | 27 | |
| 8 | Hessah Alzayed (KUW) | 97 | 97 | 97 | 100 | 391 | 28 | 51.4 |
| 9 | Jennifer Olry (FRA) | 97 | 99 | 97 | 98 | 391 | 26 | 49.7 |
| 10 | Sadiya Sultana (BAN) | 96 | 98 | 99 | 97 | 390 | 29 | |
| 11 | Malin Westerheim (NOR) | 99 | 96 | 98 | 97 | 390 | 27 | |
| 12 | Shen Li (CHN) | 98 | 97 | 99 | 96 | 390 | 26 | |
| 13 | Jenna Mackenzie (NZL) | 97 | 97 | 98 | 96 | 388 | 25 | |
| 14 | Katinka Szijj (HUN) | 94 | 99 | 100 | 95 | 388 | 20 | |
| 15 | Bahya Mansour Al Hamad (QAT) | 97 | 97 | 99 | 94 | 387 | 24 | |
| 16 | Dina Elharouni (EGY) | 96 | 96 | 96 | 98 | 386 | 22 | |
| 17 | Isamar Guerrero (MEX) | 97 | 96 | 96 | 96 | 385 | 22 | |
| 18 | Cornelia Enser (AUT) | 95 | 97 | 95 | 96 | 383 | 18 | |
| 19 | Polymaria Velasquez (GUA) | 94 | 93 | 96 | 97 | 380 | 17 | |
| 20 | Majduleen Milud (LBA) | 91 | 91 | 87 | 89 | 358 | 4 | |

== Final ==
| Rank | Athlete | Quali | Series | | | | | | | | | | Final | Total |
| Rank | Athlete | Quali | 1 | 2 | 3 | 4 | 5 | 6 | 7 | 8 | 9 | 10 | Final | Total |
|---|---|---|---|---|---|---|---|---|---|---|---|---|---|---|
| 1st place, gold medalist(s) | Dowon Go (KOR) | 397 | 9.9 | 10.4 | 10.5 | 10.0 | 10.5 | 10.4 | 9.9 | 10.6 | 10.7 | 10.2 | 103.1 | 500.1 |
| 2nd place, silver medalist(s) | Gabriela Vognarova (CZE) | 397 | 9.9 | 10.0 | 9.5 | 9.9 | 10.6 | 10.1 | 10.5 | 10.3 | 10.0 | 10.8 | 101.6 | 498.6 |
| 3rd place, bronze medalist(s) | Jasmin Mischler (SUI) | 395 | 10.2 | 10.7 | 9.6 | 10.4 | 10.3 | 9.9 | 10.5 | 10.3 | 10.5 | 10.7 | 103.1 | 498.1 |
| 4 | Yvonne Schlotterbeck (GER) | 399 | 8.1 | 10.1 | 9.1 | 9.7 | 9.9 | 10.5 | 10.6 | 9.5 | 10.7 | 10.6 | 98.8 | 497.8 |
| 5 | Neha Milind Sapte (IND) | 392 | 10.6 | 10.6 | 9.8 | 10.1 | 10.0 | 10.5 | 10.4 | 10.4 | 10.9 | 10.4 | 103.7 | 495.7 |
| 6 | Tanja Perec (CRO) | 393 | 10.3 | 10.6 | 10.2 | 9.8 | 9.3 | 10.2 | 10.0 | 9.8 | 10.5 | 10.5 | 101.2 | 494.2 |
| 7 | Shang Hui Carol Lee (SIN) | 393 | 10.1 | 9.9 | 9.8 | 10.3 | 10.4 | 9.7 | 9.4 | 10.1 | 10.1 | 10.4 | 100.2 | 493.2 |
| 8 | Hessah Alzayed (KUW) | 391 | 10.3 | 9.7 | 9.9 | 10.5 | 10.6 | 10.3 | 9.4 | 10.5 | 10.6 | 9.9 | 101.7 | 492.7 |
