= Yemen at the 2010 Summer Youth Olympics =

- IOC code: YEM
- NOC: Yemen Olympic Committee

in Singapore
- Competitors: 5 in 3 sports
- Flag bearer: Ammar Ghanim

Summer Youth Olympics appearances
- 2010; 2014; 2018

Yemen competed at the 2010 Summer Youth Olympics, the inaugural Youth Olympic Games, held in Singapore from 14 August to 26 August 2010.

== Athletics ==
=== Boys ===
Track and Road Events

Athletes	Event	Qualification		Final	
Athletes	Event	Result	Rank	Result	Rank
Mohammed Al-Omaisi	Boys’ 400m Hurdles	55.92	16 qC	1:11.66	14
Waleed Elayah	Boys’ 2000m Steeplechase	5:51.58	4 Q	5:45.87	6

=== Girls ===
Track and Road Events

Athletes	Event	Qualification		Final	
Athletes	Event	Result	Rank	Result	Rank
Belqes Sharaf Addin	Girls’ 1000m	3:37.40	28 qB	3:41.99	29

== Judo ==
Individual

Athlete	Event	Round 1	Round 2	Round 3	Semifinals	Final	Rank
Athlete	Event	Opposition Result	Opposition Result	Opposition Result	Opposition Result	Opposition Result	Rank
Abdulrahman Anter	Boys' -55 kg	BYE	Rivadulla (ESP); L 000-100	Repechage; Basile (ITA); L 000-111	Did not advance		9

Team

Team	Event	Round 1	Round 2	Semifinals	Final	Rank
Team	Event	Opposition Result	Opposition Result	Opposition Result	Opposition Result	Rank
Osaka; Sothea Sam (CAM); Abdulrahman Anter (YEM); Jing Fang Tang (SIN); Brandon Arends (ARU); Laura Naginskaite (LTU); Alexios Ntanatsidis (GRE); Natalia Kubin (GER); Bruno Abel Villalba (ARG)	Mixed Team	Barcelona; W 5-3	Belgrade; L 4-4 (1-3)	Did not advance		5

== Swimming ==
Athletes	Event	Heat		Semifinal		Final	
Athletes	Event	Time	Position	Time	Position	Time	Position
Ammar Ghanim	Boys’ 50m Backstroke			37.56	15	Did not advance	
Ammar Ghanim	Boys’ 100m Backstroke	DNS		Did not advance			
