= Turkmenistan at the 2010 Summer Youth Olympics =

- IOC code: TKM
- NOC: National Olympic Committee of Turkmenistan

in Singapore
- Competitors: 5 in 4 sports
- Flag bearer: Nursähet Pazzyýew
- Medals Ranked 84th: Gold 0 Silver 0 Bronze 1 Total 1

Summer Youth Olympics appearances (overview)
- 2010; 2014; 2018

Turkmenistan participated in the 2010 Summer Youth Olympics in Singapore.

== Medalists ==
Medal	Name	Sport	Event	Date
Silver	Jennet Geldibaýewa	Judo	Mixed Team	25 Aug
Bronze	Nursähet Pazzyýew	Boxing	Men's Welter 69kg	24 Aug

== Boxing ==
Boys

Athlete	Event	Preliminaries	Semifinals	Final	Rank
Nursähet Pazzyýew	Welterweight (69kg)		Ahmad Mamadjanov (UZB); L 0-2	3rd Place Bout; Islomzhon Dalibaev (KGZ); W 7-0	Bronze medal

== Judo ==
Individual

Athlete	Event	Round 1	Round 2	Round 3	Semifinals	Final	Rank
Athlete	Event	Opposition Result	Opposition Result	Opposition Result	Opposition Result	Opposition Result	Rank
Jennet Geldibaýewa	Girls' -52 kg	Krišandová (SVK); W 000*-000	Ri (PRK); L 000-020	Repechage; Tang (SIN); W 100-000	Repechage; Prince (NED); L 010-011	Did not advance	7

Team

Team	Event	Round 1	Round 2	Semifinals	Final	Rank
Team	Event	Opposition Result	Opposition Result	Opposition Result	Opposition Result	Rank
Belgrade; Anna Dmitrieva (RUS); Jeremy Saywell (MLT); Jennet Geldibaýewa (TKM); Babacar Cisse (SEN); Haley Baxter (NZL); Otgonbayaryn Dölgöön (MGL); Lola Mansour (BEL); Marius Piepke (GER)	Mixed Team	BYE	Osaka; W 4-4 (3-1)	Tokyo; W 5-3	Essen; L 1-6	Silver medal

== Swimming ==
Athletes	Event	Heat		Semifinal		Final	
Athletes	Event	Time	Position	Time	Position	Time	Position
Jennet Saryýewa	Girls’ 50m Freestyle	32.27	54	Did not advance			
Jennet Saryýewa	Girls’ 100m Freestyle	1:14.28	53	Did not advance			

== Weightlifting ==
Athlete	Event	Snatch	Clean & Jerk	Total	Rank
Ygtyýar Matkarimow	Boys' 56kg	95	120	215	7
Baýmyrat Orazdurdyýew	Boys' 62kg	101	121	222	9
