= Judo at the 2010 Summer Youth Olympics – Girls' 52 kg =

Judo competition

The Girls' 52 kg tournament in Judo at the 2010 Summer Youth Olympics was held on August 22 at the International Convention Centre.

This event was the second lightest of the girl's judo weight classes, limiting competitors to a maximum of 52 kilograms of body mass. The tournament bracket consisted of a single-elimination contest culminating in a gold medal match. There was also a repechage to determine the winners of the two bronze medals. Each judoka who had lost before the finals competed in the repechage with the two finalists getting bronze medals.

== Medalists ==
Gold	Katelyn Bouyssou; United States
Silver	Anna Dmitrieva; Russia
Bronze	Ri Un-ju; North Korea
Bronze	Christine Huck; Austria

== Results ==
=== Main Bracket ===
Round of 16
Odette Giuffrida (ITA)	000
Katelyn Bouyssou (USA)	011
Alexandra Pop (ROU)	101
Ecaterina Guica (CAN)	011
Maja Rasińska (POL)	000
Julia Rosso-Richetto (FRA)	100
Andrea Krišandová (SVK)	000
Jennet Geldibaýewa (TKM)	001
Laura Prince (NED)	000
Ri Un-ju (PRK)	010
Anna Dmitrieva (RUS)	110
Tang Jing Fang (SIN)	000

Quarterfinals
Katelyn Bouyssou (USA)	020
Alexandra Pop (ROU)	000
Julia Rosso-Richetto (FRA)	000
Christine Huck (AUT)	001
Jennet Geldibaýewa (TKM)	000
Ri Un-ju (PRK)	020
Wu Yu-chun (TPE)	001
Anna Dmitrieva (RUS)	011

Semifinals
Katelyn Bouyssou (USA)	101
Christine Huck (AUT)	000
Ri Un-ju (PRK)	001
Anna Dmitrieva (RUS)	100

Finals
Katelyn Bouyssou (USA)	021
Anna Dmitrieva (RUS)	000

=== Repechage ===
First round
Odette Giuffrida (ITA)	012
Ecaterina Guica (CAN)	000
Maja Rasińska (POL)	BYE
Andrea Krišandová (SVK)	000
Laura Prince (NED)	001
Tang Jing Fang (SIN)	BYE

Second round
Odette Giuffrida (ITA)	000
Julia Rosso-Richetto (FRA)	001
Maja Rasińska (POL)	021
Alexandra Pop (ROU)	000
Laura Prince (NED)	010
Wu Yu-chun (TPE)	001
Tang Jing Fang (SIN)	000
Jennet Geldibaýewa (TKM)	100

Third round
Julia Rosso-Richetto (FRA)	000
Maja Rasińska (POL)	100
Laura Prince (NED)	011
Jennet Geldibaýewa (TKM)	010

Bronze Medal Finals
Maja Rasińska (POL)	000
Ri Un-ju (PRK)	100
Laura Prince (NED)	000
Christine Huck (AUT)	011
