= Legacy High School (Colorado) =

Location
- 2701 W. 136th Avenue; Broomfield, Colorado 80023; United States; 39°56′38″N 105°01′10″W

Information
- Type: Public high school
- Motto: 'Sko Boltz'
- Established: 2000 (26 years ago)
- School district: Adams 12 Five Star Schools
- Superintendent: Christopher Gdowski
- CEEB code: 060163
- Principal: Sara Marx
- Staff: 102.94 (FTE)
- Grades: 9-12
- Student to teacher ratio: 21:1
- Colors: Vegas gold, navy blue
- Athletics: CHSAA 5A
- Mascot: Zeus/Lightning Bolt
- Website: legacy.adams12.org

Legacy High School is a high school located in Broomfield, Colorado that opened in 2000. It is within the Adams 12 Five Star Schools District. As of the 2025–2026 school year, the school had an enrollment of 2,048 students.

== Academic programs ==
The school offers Advanced Placement classes. Additionally, the school offers the Legacy 2000 program to students interested in STEM fields. The four-year program prepares students for college and a career by enhancing writing, public speaking, problem solving, and engineering project skills.

== Incidents ==
In 2016, a school bus carrying the Legacy High School football team crashed into a concrete support near the terminal while driving from Denver International Airport, killing the bus driver and injuring multiple students and coaches.

== Athletics ==
Legacy High School competes in the Colorado High School Activities Association (CHSAA) 5A classification. Athletic conference alignments vary by sport and CHSAA realignment cycle. For the 2024–2026 cycle, the school is listed as participating in the Granite Peaks League.

Legacy offers boys' and girls' cross country, football, boys' and girls' golf, gymnastics, cheer, dance, boys' and girls' soccer, softball, boys' and girls' tennis, boys' and girls' volleyball, boys' and girls' basketball, boys' and girls' wrestling, baseball, boys' and girls' swimming, boys' and girls' track and field, flag football, and boys' and girls' lacrosse.

=== Softball ===
The Legacy softball program was the 2007, 2008, 2009, 2010, 2011, and 2013 state champions.

=== Basketball ===
The Legacy girls' varsity basketball team won the Colorado 5A State Championship during the 2011-2012 season.

=== Track and Field ===
Legacy High School has had individual state champions in both boys' and girls' track and field, including titles in the high jump and 400 meters in 2025.

=== Swimming ===
Steve Schmuhl won the Colorado 5A State Championships in the 100 and 200 yard freestyles in 2008 and 2009. He set state records in both events.

== Arts and music ==
=== Band ===
The Legacy High School marching band was the CBA State Marching Band champion in 2006, 2007, 2008, 2009, 2010, 2011, 2014, 2015, 2016, 2017, 2021, and 2026 for class 5A, surpassing Pomona High School for the record of most CBA State Marching Band Championship titles with 12. The Legacy Marching band was the silver medalist for the CBA State Marching Band State Championships in 2012, 2013, 2018, 2019, 2022, 2023, 2024, and 2025. The Legacy Marching Band has been a state finalist every year of competition since the band started competition one year after the school opened. The band was the 1st place overall marching band in the 2010 Parade of Lights. The band was invited to travel to London, England in 2009 to perform in the 2010 New Years Day Parade. In 2010, the band was selected to play in the 2011 Macy's Thanksgiving Day Parade. The winter percussion ensemble earned state championships in 2006, 2007, 2009, 2022, 2023, 2024, 2025, and 2026. The winter guard earned six consecutive state championships from 2004 to 2009 and won an additional state championship in 2019. The program also earned a silver medal at the 2009 WGI World Championships.

The Legacy Marching Band performed in the 2015 Rose Parade in Pasadena, California on New Year's Day.

In March 2018, the Legacy Marching Band performed in Dublin's St. Patrick's Day Festival and was awarded 'Best Overall Band', beating out over ten other competing bands.

The Legacy Marching Band returned to march in the 2025 Dublin St. Patrick's Day Festival, where it received the “Best Junior Band (High School Band) Performance” award.

== Notable alumni ==
- Shelby Babcock – American softball pitcher
- Tajon Buchanan – Canadian professional soccer player and member of the Canada men's national soccer team
- Lucas Gilbreath – American professional baseball pitcher
- John Hoyland – American football placekicker
- Nick Kasa – former American football tight end who played in the National Football League (NFL) for the Oakland Raiders and Denver Broncos
- Halle Mackiewicz – American professional soccer goalkeeper
- Steve Schmuhl – American competitive swimmer specializing in medley events who represented the United States at the 2010 Summer Youth Olympic Games and the 2012 FINA World Swimming Championships (25 m).
- Kip Smith- American football player
