= Athletes from Kuwait at the 2010 Summer Youth Olympics =

- Athletes from Kuwait competed under the Olympic flag, due to the IOC's suspension of the Kuwait Olympic Committee
- IOC code: IOC
- NOC: Kuwait Olympic Committee

in Singapore
- Competitors: 3 in 3 sports
- Flag bearer: None
- Medals Ranked 84th: Gold 0 Silver 0 Bronze 1 Total 1

Summer Youth Olympics appearances
- 2010; 2014; 2018; 2026

Athletes from Kuwait competed in the 2010 Summer Youth Olympics in Singapore. However, Kuwaiti athletes competed under the Olympic flag as the Kuwait Olympic Committee had been suspended by the International Olympic Committee in January 2010 due to government interference.

== Medallists ==
Medal	Name	Sport	Event	Date
Bronze	Abdullah Altuwaini	Swimming	Youth Men's 50m Backstroke	18 Aug

== Athletics ==
=== Boys ===
Track and Road Events

Athletes	Event	Qualification		Final	
Athletes	Event	Result	Rank	Result	Rank
Yousef Karam	Boys’ 400m Hurdles	DNS qC		DNS	

== Shooting ==
Rifle

Athlete	Event	Qualification			Final		
Athlete	Event	Score	Shoot-Off	Rank	Score	Total	Rank
Hessah Alzayed	Girls' 10m Air Rifle	391	51.4	8 Q	101.7	492.7	8

== Swimming ==
Athletes	Event	Heat		Semifinal		Final	
Athletes	Event	Time	Position	Time	Position	Time	Position
Abdullah Altuwaini	Boys’ 100m Freestyle	52.74	30	Did not advance			
Abdullah Altuwaini	Boys’ 200m Freestyle	DNS				Did not advance	
Abdullah Altuwaini	Boys’ 50m Backstroke			26.62	4 Q	26.46	Bronze medal
Abdullah Altuwaini	Boys’ 100m Backstroke	57.88	10 Q	57.41	8 Q	DSQ	

== See also ==
- Athletes from Kuwait at the 2010 Asian Games
- Athletes from Kuwait at the 2010 Asian Para Games
- Athletes from Kuwait at the 2011 Asian Winter Games
