= Triathlon at the 2010 Summer Youth Olympics – Girls' =

Girls' at the I Summer Youth Olympic Games
- Venue: East Coast Park
- Dates: 15 August 2010
- Competitors: 32 from 32 nations

Medalists
1st place, gold medalist(s)		Yuka Sato	Japan
2nd place, silver medalist(s)		Ellie Salthouse	Australia
3rd place, bronze medalist(s)		Kelly Whitley	United States

Girls' triathlon was part of the triathlon at the 2010 Summer Youth Olympics programme. The event consisted of 750 metres (0.47 mi) swimming, 20 kilometres (12 mi) cycling, and 5 kilometres (3.1 mi) running. It was held on 15 August 2010 at East Coast Park. The park is Singapore's most popular public beach and park; it is the venue of the Osim Singapore Triathlon, an Olympic triathlon event which began in 2002. Competitors swam in the open seas of the Singapore Strait and raced on the park's 12-kilometre (7.5 mi) track. U.S. triathlon coach Keith Dickson said the course favored strong swimmers and fast runners. Athletes were faced with environmental challenges such as strong sea currents and tropical heat and humidity. As the first medal event of the Singapore Games, the winner of this triathlon received the first gold medal in the Youth Olympic Games.

Yuka Sato of Japan finished the race in first place. She had placed third after the first leg of the race and fifth after the second leg. In the final stretch, Sato sped past Mexico's Adriana Barraza and Australia's Ellie Salthouse. As she crossed the finish line, Sato carried a Japanese flag that had been handed to her by a spectator. She was the only competitor who finished in the top 10 of the ITU Junior Triathlon World Championships in 2009. Salthouse and American Kelly Whitley finished in second and third place, respectively. Canada's Christine Ridenour, who was one of the favourites to win a medal, was involved in a bicycle crash and finished 14th. Singapore's Clara Wong finished in 30th place, and two competitors did not finish after a bicycle crash.

Most of the competition's 32 participants had qualified through the International Triathlon Union's continental Olympic qualifying events.

== Medalists ==
Gold	Silver	Bronze
Yuka Sato; Japan	Ellie Salthouse; Australia	Kelly Whitley; United States

== Results ==
The race began at approximately 9:00 a.m. (UTC+8) on 15 August at East Coast Park.

Rank	Start No.	Triathlete	Swimming	Transit 1	Cycling	Transit 2	Running	Total time	Difference
1st place, gold medalist(s)	10	Yuka Sato (JPN)	9:32	0:35	32:10	0:27	18:05	1:00:49.69	±0:00.00
2nd place, silver medalist(s)	25	Ellie Salthouse (AUS)	10:07	0:35	31:34	0:26	18:22	1:01:04.39	+0:14.70
3rd place, bronze medalist(s)	2	Kelly Whitley (USA)	10:13	0:33	31:31	0:25	18:31	1:01:13.49	+0:23.80
4	30	Adriana Barraza (MEX)	10:02	0:35	31:41	0:23	19:07	1:01:48.57	+0:58.88
5	12	Eszter Dudás (HUN)	10:04	0:34	31:40	0:26	19:11	1:01:55.06	+1:05.37
6	32	Fanny Beisaron (ISR)	9:58	0:40	31:41	0:26	19:22	1:02:07.29	+1:17.60
7	31	Marlene Gomez (GER)	9:40	0:34	32:02	0:28	19:43	1:02:27.79	+1:38.10
8	26	Maddie Dillon (NZL)	10:12	0:35	31:31	0:27	19:49	1:02:34.50	+1:44.81
9	15	Laura Casey (IRL)	10:00	0:32	31:45	0:28	19:55	1:02:40.87	+1:51.18
10	3	Monika Oražem (SLO)	9:34	0:32	32:11	0:27	20:25	1:03:09.83	+2:20.14
11	19	Anna Godoy (ESP)	9:34	0:35	32:10	0:25	20:45	1:03:29.90	+2:40.21
12	22	Andrea Longueira (CHI)	10:02	0:36	31:41	0:30	20:53	1:03:42.88	+2:53.19
13	18	Elinor Thorogood (GBR)	9:57	0:33	31:48	0:28	21:08	1:03:54.08	+3:04.39
14	24	Christine Ridenour (CAN)	9:28	0:33	34:28	0:25	19:13	1:04:07.56	+3:17.87
15	23	Annie Thoren (SWE)	9:31	0:35	32:10	0:27	21:52	1:04:35.16	+3:45.47
16	33	Charlotte Deldaele (BEL)	9:34	0:34	34:22	0:25	20:29	1:05:24.66	+4:34.97
17	1	Hui Wai Sum Vincci (HKG)	10:44	0:33	33:14	0:25	20:50	1:05:46.13	+4:56.44
18	17	Raquel Mafra Rocha (POR)	10:02	0:37	32:58	0:32	22:00	1:06:09.22	+5:19.53
19	9	Alessia Orla (ITA)	9:33	0:33	34:24	0:29	21:14	1:06:13.69	+5:24.00
20	14	Jessica Piedra (ECU)	10:06	0:35	33:51	0:27	21:40	1:06:39.86	+5:50.17
21	20	Karolina Solovyova (KAZ)	10:33	0:39	33:20	0:32	21:55	1:06:59.78	+6:10.09
22	4	Leslie Amat Alvarez (CUB)	10:01	0:33	33:57	0:26	22:18	1:07:15.28	+6:25.59
23	29	Sara Vilić (CRO)	9:34	0:37	33:12	0:27	23:46	1:07:36.84	+6:47.15
24	8	Andrea Arenas (VEN)	10:14	0:36	33:40	0:27	23:52	1:08:49.53	+7:59.84
25	16	Viviana González (COL)	10:06	0:37	33:48	0:30	23:49	1:08:50.22	+8:00.53
26	5	Ma Mingxiu (CHN)	10:06	0:36	35:22	0:30	22:21	1:08:55.96	+8:06.27
27	21	Andrea Brown (ZIM)	10:41	0:37	34:45	0:24	23:32	1:09:59.30	+9:09.61
28	11	Tüvshinjargalyn Enkhjargal (MGL)	10:35	0:38	38:11	0:36	24:22	1:14:22.78	+13:33.09
29	7	Mattika Maneekaew (THA)	12:33	0:40	37:52	0:33	23:05	1:14:43.06	+13:53.37
30	6	Wan Qi Clara Wong (SIN)	9:58	0:41	47:24	0:34	22:53	1:21:30.85	+20:41.16
—	28	Cristina Luizzet Betancourt de Leon (PUR)	10:15	0:37	—	—	—	Did not finish	—
—	27	Kim Heesun (KOR)	10:05	0:36	—	—	—	Did not finish	—

Note: No one is allotted the number 13.
