= Cambodia at the 2010 Summer Youth Olympics =

- IOC code: CAM
- NOC: National Olympic Committee of Cambodia

in Singapore
- Competitors: 3 in 3 sports
- Flag bearer: Sothea Sam
- Medals Ranked 84th: Gold 0 Silver 0 Bronze 1 Total 1

Summer Youth Olympics appearances
- 2010; 2014; 2018

Cambodia participated in the 2010 Summer Youth Olympics in Singapore.

== Medalists ==
Medal	Name	Sport	Event	Date
Bronze	Sothea Sam	Judo	Girls' -44kg	21 Aug

== Athletics ==
=== Boys ===
Track and Road Events

Athletes	Event	Qualification		Final	
Athletes	Event	Result	Rank	Result	Rank
Samphors Som	Boys’ 3000m	10:16.03	20 qB	DNS	

== Judo ==
Individual

Athlete	Event	Round 1	Round 2	Round 3	Semifinals	Final	Rank
Athlete	Event	Opposition Result	Opposition Result	Opposition Result	Opposition Result	Opposition Result	Rank
Sothea Sam	Girls' -44 kg	BYE	Rahming (BAH); W 012-100		Batizi (HUN); L 000-020	Bronze-medal match Damyanova (BUL); W 100-000	Bronze medal

Team

Team	Event	Round 1	Round 2	Semifinals	Final	Rank
Team	Event	Opposition Result	Opposition Result	Opposition Result	Opposition Result	Rank
Osaka; Sothea Sam (CAM); Abdulrahman Anter (YEM); Jing Fang Tang (SIN); Brandon Arends (ARU); Laura Naginskaite (LTU); Alexios Ntanatsidis (GRE); Natalia Kubin (GER); Bruno Abel Villalba (ARG)	Mixed Team	Barcelona; W 5-3	Belgrade; L 4-4 (1-3)	Did not advance		5

== Swimming ==
Athletes	Event	Heat		Semifinal		Final	
Athletes	Event	Time	Position	Time	Position	Time	Position
Odam Lim	Boys' 50m Freestyle	29.44	45	Did not advance			
