= Athletics at the 2010 Summer Youth Olympics – Boys' 400 metre hurdles =

Athletics – Boys' 400 metres hurdles at the I Summer Youth Olympic Games
- Venue: Bishan Stadium
- Date: August 19–23
- Competitors: 18 from 18 nations

Medalists
1st place, gold medalist(s)		Norge Lara Sotomayor	Cuba
2nd place, silver medalist(s)		Kumar Durgesh	India
3rd place, bronze medalist(s)		William Mbevi Mutunga	Kenya

The boys' 400 metres hurdles competition at the 2010 Youth Olympic Games was held on 19–23 August 2010 in Bishan Stadium.

== Schedule ==
Date	Time	Round
19 August 2010	10:10	Heats
23 August 2010	19:20	Final

== Results ==
=== Heats ===
Rank	Heat	Lane	Athlete	Time	Notes	Q
1	3	3	Norge Sotomayor Lara (CUB)	51.74		FA
2	2	2	Kumar Durgesh (IND)	52.20		FA
3	1	3	Oskari Moro (FIN)	52.70		FA
4	1	4	Ali Alghamdi (KSA)	52.89		FA
5	2	5	Felix Franz (GER)	52.95		FA
6	1	7	William Mbevi Mutunga (KEN)	53.08		FA
7	2	3	Raheen Williams (AUS)	53.11		FA
8	3	5	Enrique Gonzalez (ESP)	53.14		FA
9	1	6	Schalk Burger (RSA)	53.22		FB
10	3	2	Tramaine Maloney (BAR)	53.86		FB
11	2	7	Ali Mohamed (SUD)	54.38		FB
12	3	6	Stephen Newbold (BAH)	54.40		FB
13	1	5	Gerald Drummond (CRC)	54.51	PB	FB
14	2	6	Genki Naruse (JPN)	54.71		FC
15	2	4	Sofiane Amour (ALG)	54.79	SB	FC
16	3	7	Mohammed Al-Omaisi (YEM)	55.91		FC
	1	2	Yousef Karam (KUW)	DNS		FC
	3	4	Gregory Coleman (USA)	DSQ		FC

=== Finals ===
==== Final C ====
Rank	Lane	Athlete	Time	Notes
1	9	Genki Naruse (JPN)	52.86	
2	5	Sofiane Amour (ALG)	54.47	PB
3	4	Mohammed Al-Omaisi (YEM)	1:11.66	
	2	Yousef Karam (KUW)	DSQ	
	3	Gregory Coleman (USA)	DSQ	

==== Final B ====
Rank	Lane	Athlete	Time	Notes
1	5	Schalk Burger (RSA)	52.39	
2	6	Tramaine Maloney (BAR)	53.20	PB
3	3	Stephen Newbold (BAH)	53.20	
4	4	Ali Mohamed (SUD)	54.57	
5	1	Gerald Drummond (CRC)	54.83	

==== Final A ====
Rank	Lane	Athlete	Time	Notes
1st place, gold medalist(s)	5	Norge Sotomayor Lara (CUB)	50.69	
2nd place, silver medalist(s)	4	Kumar Durgesh (IND)	50.81	PB
3rd place, bronze medalist(s)	7	William Mbevi Mutunga (KEN)	51.23	PB
4	8	Felix Franz (GER)	51.60	
5	2	Enrique Gonzalez (ESP)	52.35	
6	1	Raheen Williams (AUS)	52.38	PB
	6	Oskari Moro (FIN)	DQ	
	3	Ali Alghamdi (KSA)	DNS	
