= Fencing at the 2010 Summer Youth Olympics – Cadet female épée =

These are the results of the cadet female épée competition at the 2010 Summer Youth Olympics. The competition was held on August 17.

== Results ==
=== Pool Round ===
==== Pool 1 ====
| # | Name | Bouts | | | | | | | V | Ind | TG | TR | Diff | Rank |
| # | Name | 1 | 2 | 3 | 4 | 5 | 6 | 7 | V | Ind | TG | TR | Diff | Rank |
|---|---|---|---|---|---|---|---|---|---|---|---|---|---|---|
| 1 | Rania Herlina Rahardja (SIN) | | 5V | 3D | 2D | 1D | 2D | 3D | 1 | 0.167 | 16 | 26 | +6 | 6 |
| 2 | Damyan Jaqman (PLE) | 2D | | 0D | 0D | 3D | 1D | 3D | 0 | 0.000 | 9 | 30 | -21 | 7 |
| 3 | Katharine Holmes (USA) | 5V | 5V | | 1D | 3V | 4V | 5V | 5 | 0.833 | 23 | 19 | +9 | 2 |
| 4 | Lin Sheng (CHN) | 5V | 5V | 5V | | 5V | 5V | 5V | 6 | 1.000 | 30 | 10 | +20 | 1 |
| 5 | Alberta Santuccio (ITA) | 5V | 5V | 2D | 2D | | 4D | 5V | 3 | 0.500 | 23 | 18 | +5 | 4 |
| 6 | Martyna Swatowska (POL) | 5V | 5V | 3D | 4D | 5V | | 5V | 4 | 0.667 | 27 | 19 | +8 | 3 |
| 7 | Pauline Brunner (SUI) | 4V | 5V | 1D | 1D | 1D | 3D | | 2 | 0.333 | 15 | 26 | -11 | 5 |

==== Pool 2 ====
| # | Name | Bouts | | | | | | V | Ind | TG | TR | Diff | Rank |
| # | Name | 1 | 2 | 3 | 4 | 5 | 6 | V | Ind | TG | TR | Diff | Rank |
|---|---|---|---|---|---|---|---|---|---|---|---|---|---|
| 1 | Wanda Matshaya (RSA) | | 3D | 1D | 2D | 5V | 3D | 1 | 0.200 | 14 | 24 | -10 | 6 |
| 2 | Amalia Tătăran (ROU) | 5V | | 3D | 2D | 5V | 5V | 3 | 0.600 | 20 | 18 | +2 | 3 |
| 3 | Yulia Bakhareva (RUS) | 5V | 5V | | 5V | 5V | 5V | 5 | 1.000 | 25 | 15 | +10 | 1 |
| 4 | Lee Hye Won (KOR) | 5V | 5V | 4D | | 3D | 5V | 3 | 0.600 | 22 | 16 | +6 | 2 |
| 5 | Amy Radford (GBR) | 4D | 4D | 4D | 5V | | 3V | 2 | 0.400 | 20 | 20 | 0 | 4 |
| 6 | Clara Isabel Di Tella (ARG) | 5V | 1D | 3D | 2D | 2D | | 1 | 0.200 | 13 | 21 | –8 | 5 |

=== Bracket ===
Round of 16
1 | Lin Sheng (CHN)
16 | BYE
9 | Pauline Brunner (SUI) | 13
8 | Amy Radford (GBR) | 15
5 | Lee Hye Won (KOR) | 15
12 | Rania Herlina Rahardja (SIN) | 10
13 | Damyan Jaqman (PLE) | 4
4 | Martyna Swatowska (POL) | 15
3 | Katharine Holmes (USA)
14 | BYE
11 | Wanda Matshaya (RSA) | 10
6 | Amalia Tătăran (ROU) | 15
7 | Alberta Santuccio (ITA) | 15
10 | Clara Isabel Di Tella (ARG) | 7
15 | BYE
2 | Yulia Bakhareva (RUS)

Quarterfinals
1 | Lin Sheng (CHN) | 15
8 | Amy Radford (GBR) | 5
5 | Lee Hye Won (KOR) | 14
4 | Martyna Swatowska (POL) | 15
3 | Katharine Holmes (USA) | 15
6 | Amalia Tătăran (ROU) | 10
7 | Alberta Santuccio (ITA) | 13
2 | Yulia Bakhareva (RUS) | 7

Semifinals
1 | Lin Sheng (CHN) | 15
4 | Martyna Swatowska (POL) | 11
3 | Katharine Holmes (USA) | 8
7 | Alberta Santuccio (ITA) | 9

Final
1 | Lin Sheng (CHN) | 9
7 | Alberta Santuccio (ITA) | 8

| Bronze Medal |
| 4 | Martyna Swatowska (POL) | 15 |
| 3 | Katharine Holmes (USA) | 9 |

== Final standings ==
| Rank | Name | NOC | Team |
|---|---|---|---|
| 1st place, gold medalist(s) | Lin Sheng | China | Asia 1 |
| 2nd place, silver medalist(s) | Alberta Santuccio | Italy | Europe 1 |
| 3rd place, bronze medalist(s) | Martyna Swatowska | Poland | Europe 2 |
| 4 | Katharine Holmes | United States | Americas 1 |
| 5 | Yulia Bakhareva | Russia | Europe 3 |
| 6 | Lee Hye Won | South Korea | Asia 2 |
| 7 | Amalia Tătăran | Romania | Europe 4 |
| 8 | Amy Radford | Great Britain | |
| 9 | Pauline Brunner | Switzerland | |
| 10 | Clara Isabel Di Tella | Argentina | Americas 2 |
| 11 | Wanda Matshaya | South Africa | Africa |
| 12 | Rania Herlina Rahardja | Singapore | |
| 13 | Damyan Jaqman | Palestine | |
