= Singapore at the 2010 Summer Youth Olympics =

- IOC code: SIN
- NOC: Singapore National Olympic Council

in Singapore
- Competitors: 129 in 26 sports
- Flag bearer: Jabez Su
- Medals Ranked 62nd: Gold 0 Silver 2 Bronze 4 Total 6

Summer Youth Olympics appearances
- 2010; 2014; 2018

Singapore was the host of the inaugural 2010 Summer Youth Olympics. It participated in all the 26 sports, with a total of 129 athletes representing the nation.

== Medalists ==
Medals awarded to participants of mixed-NOC (Combined) teams are represented in italics. These medals are not counted towards the individual NOC medal tally.

Singapore medalists:

Medal	Name	Sport	Event	Date
Silver	Rainer Kai Wee Ng	Swimming	Youth Men's 50m Backstroke	18 Aug
Silver	Isabelle Li	Table tennis	Women's Singles	23 Aug
Bronze	Daryl Tan	Taekwondo	Men's 55kg	16 Aug
Bronze	Shafinas Abdul Rahman	Taekwondo	Women's 55kg	16 Aug
Bronze	Abdul Dayyan Jaffar	Archery	Mixed team	19 Aug
Bronze	Audrey Pei Lin Yong	Sailing	Windsurfing (Techno 293)	25 Aug
Bronze	Singapore national under-15 football team: Hamzah Fazil; Hazim Hassan; Dhukhilan Jeevamani; Radhi Kasim; Iskander Khairul; Brandon Koh; Illyas Lee; Jeffrey Lightfoot; Ammirul Emmran; Irfan Asyraf; Syazwan Zin; Firdaus Sham; Hanafi Akbar; Bryan Neubronner; Sunny Ng; Fashah Rosedin; Muhaimin Suhaimi; Jonathan Tan	Football	Boys' tournament	25 Aug

== Archery ==
The Republic's Abdul Dayyan and Turkey's Begunhan Elif Unsal won the bronze medal playoff in the mixed team event, which was held at the Kallang Field on Thursday. Needing a perfect score of 20, they beat Bangladesh's Mohamed Emdadul Haque Milon and Spain's Miriam Alarcón 20–19 in the tie-breaking set.

Boys

Athlete	Event	Ranking Round		Round of 32	Round of 16	Quarterfinals	Semifinals	Final	
Athlete	Event	Score	Seed	Opposition Score	Opposition Score	Opposition Score	Opposition Score	Opposition Score	Rank
Abdud Dayyan Bin Mohamed Jaffar	Boys’ Individual	618	14	Rossignol (FRA); W 7–1	Nesbitt (GBR); W 6–4	Rajh (SLO); L 0–6	Did not advance		8

Girls

Athlete	Event	Ranking Round		Round of 32	Round of 16	Quarterfinals	Semifinals	Final	
Athlete	Event	Score	Seed	Opposition Score	Opposition Score	Opposition Score	Opposition Score	Opposition Score	Rank
Tze Rong Vanessa Loh	Girls’ Individual	601	15	Unsal (TUR); L 5–6	Did not advance				17
Elizabeth Cheok	Girls’ Individual	0	32	Kwak (KOR); L DNS	Did not advance				

Mixed Team

Athlete	Event	Partner	Round of 32	Round of 16	Quarterfinals	Semifinals	Final	
Athlete	Event	Partner	Opposition Score	Opposition Score	Opposition Score	Opposition Score	Opposition Score	Rank
Abdud Jaffar	Mixed Team	Begunhan Unsal (TUR)	Segina (RUS)/ Jaworski (POL); W 6–4	Caspersen (DEN)/ Rossignol (FRA); W 6–2	Bozic (SLO)/ Nott (AUS); W 6–2	Filippi (ITA)/ Karoukin (BLR); L 0–6	Bronze Medal Match; Alarcón (ESP)/ Milon (BAN); W 6–5	
Tze Loh	Mixed Team	Carlos Rivas (ESP)	Zaynutdinova (TJK)/ Park (KOR); W 7–3	Bozic (SLO)/ Nott (AUS); L 4–6	Did not advance			9
Elizabeth Cheok	Mixed Team	Jafet Farjat (MEX)	Song (CHN)/ Pianesi (ITA); L 0–6	Did not advance				17

== Athletics ==
=== Boys ===
Track and Road Events

Athletes	Event	Qualification		Final	
Athletes	Event	Result	Rank	Result	Rank
Zachary Ryan Devaraj	Boys’ 1000m	2:32.27	16 qB	2:31.75	16
Sean Renjie Toh	Boys’ 110m Hurdles	15.09	16 qC	14.24	14

=== Girls ===
Track and Road Events

Athletes	Event	Qualification		Final	
Athletes	Event	Result	Rank	Result	Rank
Wei Liang	Girls’ 100m	12.79	18 qC	12.85	17
Wendy Enn	Girls’ 400m	1:02.74	21 qC	1:02.43	20
Ranjitha Raja	Girls’ 1000m	3:07.66	18 qB	3:03.90	22
Wei Ning Goh	Girls’ 100m Hurdles	15.01	16 qC	14.92	17
Wei Liang (SIN); Ching-Hsien Liao (TPE); Marina Zaiko (KAZ); Elina Mikhina (KAZ)	Girls’ Medley Relay			2:15.01	5

== Badminton ==
Boys

Athlete	Event	Group Stage				Knock-Out Stage			
Athlete	Event	Match 1	Match 2	Match 3	Rank	Quarterfinal	Semifinal	Final	Rank
Huang Chao	Boys’ Singles	Bhamidipati (IND) W 2–1 (21–12, 18–21, 21–17)	Cuba (PER) W 2–0 (21–15, 21–10)	Richardson (NZL) W 2–0 (21–7, 21–8)	1 Q	Loh (MAS) L 0–2 (18–21, 16–21)	Did not advance		5

== Basketball ==
Boys

Squad List	Event	Group Stage		Placement Stage			Rank
Squad List	Event	Group C	Rank	17th–20th			Rank
Mingrong Jabez Su (C); Wen Qiang Russell Low; Jun Wei Tan; Larry Hua Sen Liew	Boys' Basketball	Central African Republic; L 17–25	5	South Africa; W 21–12	Panama; W 33–20	India; W 31–20	17
Mingrong Jabez Su (C); Wen Qiang Russell Low; Jun Wei Tan; Larry Hua Sen Liew	Boys' Basketball	Turkey; L 24–28	5	South Africa; W 21–12	Panama; W 33–20	India; W 31–20	17
Mingrong Jabez Su (C); Wen Qiang Russell Low; Jun Wei Tan; Larry Hua Sen Liew	Boys' Basketball	Israel; L 14–27	5	South Africa; W 21–12	Panama; W 33–20	India; W 31–20	17
Mingrong Jabez Su (C); Wen Qiang Russell Low; Jun Wei Tan; Larry Hua Sen Liew	Boys' Basketball	United States; L 21–31	5	South Africa; W 21–12	Panama; W 33–20	India; W 31–20	17

Girls

Squad List	Event	Group Stage		Placement Stage			Rank
Squad List	Event	Group B	Rank	17th–20th			Rank
Jia Hui Hannah Ng (C); Hui Min Tok; Zoe Eng; Rui Jia Alanna Lim	Girls' Basketball	Germany; L 22–33	5	Vanuatu; W 26–10	Thailand; L 28–29	Chile; L 15–16	19
Jia Hui Hannah Ng (C); Hui Min Tok; Zoe Eng; Rui Jia Alanna Lim	Girls' Basketball	United States; L 11–34	5	Vanuatu; W 26–10	Thailand; L 28–29	Chile; L 15–16	19
Jia Hui Hannah Ng (C); Hui Min Tok; Zoe Eng; Rui Jia Alanna Lim	Girls' Basketball	Belarus; L 9–32	5	Vanuatu; W 26–10	Thailand; L 28–29	Chile; L 15–16	19
Jia Hui Hannah Ng (C); Hui Min Tok; Zoe Eng; Rui Jia Alanna Lim	Girls' Basketball	Angola; L 14–20	5	Vanuatu; W 26–10	Thailand; L 28–29	Chile; L 15–16	19

== Boxing ==
Boys

Athlete	Event	Preliminaries	Semifinals	Final	Rank
Mohd Hamid	Light Flyweight (48kg)		Salman Alizada (AZE); L RSC R2 2:49	3rd Place Bout; Zohidjon Hoorboyev (UZB); L 0–7	4

== Canoeing ==
Boys

Athlete	Event	Time Trial		Round 1	Round 2 (Rep)	Round 3	Round 4	Round 5	Final
Athlete	Event	Time	Rank	Round 1	Round 2 (Rep)	Round 3	Round 4	Round 5	Final
Brandon Wei Cheng Ooi	Boys’ K1 Slalom	1:33.49	6	Nedyalkov (BUL); W 1:35.24-1:49.37		Aghamirzaei (IRI); W 1:35.80-1:43.21	Bernis (FRA); L 1:36.92-1:28.68	Did not advance	
Brandon Wei Cheng Ooi	Boys’ K1 Sprint	1:34.59	14	Smith (AUS); L 1:32.90-1:32.66		Kalashnikov (RUS); L 1:33.54-1:32.06	Did not advance		

Girls

Athlete	Event	Time Trial		Round 1	Round 2 (Rep)	Round 3	Round 4	Round 5	Final
Athlete	Event	Time	Rank	Round 1	Round 2 (Rep)	Round 3	Round 4	Round 5	Final
Nan Feng Wang	Girls’ K1 Slalom	1:45.09	8	Hryshyna (BLR); W 1:47.23-1:58.30		Peters (HUN); L 1:51.87-1:46.85	Did not advance		
Nan Feng Wang	Girls’ K1 Sprint	1:49.96	13	Fox (AUS); L 1:50.14-1:46.54	Zasterova (CZE); W 1:49.20-2:00.02	Bruska (POL); L 1:53.13-1:43.21	Did not advance		

== Cycling ==
Cross Country

Athlete	Event	Time	Rank	Points
Jun Jie Daniel Koh	Boys’ Cross Country	-4LAP	30	72
Nur Nasthasia Abdul Nazzeer	Girls’ Cross Country	-2LAP	22	40

Time Trial

Athlete	Event	Time	Rank	Points
Travis Joshua Woodford	Boys’ Time Trial	4:26.65	25	30
Nur Nasthasia Abdul Nazzeer	Girls’ Time Trial	3:51.74	25	40

BMX

Athlete	Event	Seeding Round		Quarterfinals							Semifinals							Final		
Athlete	Event	Seeding Round		Run 1		Run 2		Run 3		Rank	Run 1		Run 2		Run 3		Rank	Final		
Athlete	Event	Time	Rank	Time	Rank	Time	Rank	Time	Rank	Rank	Time	Rank	Time	Rank	Time	Rank	Rank	Time	Rank	Points
Alvin Hui Zhi Phoon	Boys’ BMX	DNF	30	41.300	7	41.459	7	41.749	7	7	Did not advance									72
Nur Nasthasia Abdul Nazzeer	Girls’ BMX	44.254	12	43.065	3	42.957	4	42.560	3	3 Q	42.674	6	42.029	6	41.385	6	6	Did not advance		34

Road Race

Athlete	Event	Time	Rank	Points
Jun Jie Daniel Koh	Boys’ Road Race	1:16:48	71	72
Travis Joshia Woodford	Boys’ Road Race	1:16:48	73	
Alvin Hui Zhi Phoon	Boys’ Road Race	DNF		

Overall

Team	Event	Cross Country Pts		Time Trial Pts		BMX Pts		Road Race Pts	Total	Rank
Team	Event	Boys	Girls	Boys	Girls	Boys	Girls	Road Race Pts	Total	Rank
Nur Nasthasia Abdul Nazzeer; Jun Jie Daniel Koh; Travis Joshua Woodford; Alvin Hui Zhi Phoon	Mixed Team	72	40	30	40	72	34	72	360	30

== Diving ==
Boys

Athlete	Event	Preliminary		Final	
Athlete	Event	Points	Rank	Points	Rank
Timothy Han Kuan Lee	Boys’ 3m Springboard	365.50	15	Did not advance	

Girls

Athlete	Event	Preliminary		Final	
Athlete	Event	Points	Rank	Points	Rank
Chloe Chan	Girls’ 3m Springboard	313.95	13	Did not advance	
Myra Jia Wen Lee	Girls’ 10m Platform	280.25	12 Q	273.95	12

== Equestrian ==
Athlete	Horse	Event	Round 1			Round 2			Total	Jump-Off		Rank
Athlete	Horse	Event	Penalties		Rank	Penalties		Rank	Total	Penalties	Time	Rank
Athlete	Horse	Event	Jump	Time	Rank	Jump	Time	Rank	Total	Penalties	Time	Rank
Pei Jia Caroline Chew	Gatineau	Individual Jumping	8	0	16	4	0	8	12			17
Mohamad Alanzarouti (SYR); Timur Patarov (KAZ); Abdurahman Al Marri (QAT); Pei Jia Caroline Chew (SIN); Sheikh Ali Abdulla Majid Alqassimi (UAE)	Van Diemen; Chatham Park Rosie; Emmaville Persuasion; Gatineau; Pearl Monarch	Team Jumping	~~8~~; ~~EL~~; 4; 4; 4	~~0~~; ~~EL~~; 0; 0; 0	4	~~4~~; 0; ~~8~~; 0; 0	~~0~~; 0; ~~0~~; 0; 0	1	12			4

== Fencing ==
Group Stage

Athlete	Event	Match 1	Match 2	Match 3	Match 4	Match 5	Match 6	Seed
Wei Hao Lim	Boys’ Épée	Godoy (CRC); L 3–5	Lyssov (CAN); W 5–3	Bodoczi (GER); L 0–5	Ciovica (ROU); L 4–5	Novotny (CZE); L 3–4	Na (KOR); L 2–5	12
Xian Sun Justin Ong	Boys’ Foil	Massialas (USA); L 0–5	Choi (HKG); L 4–5	Choupenitch (CZE); L 1–5	Tsoronis (DEN); L 1–5	Babaoglu (TUR); L 1–5	Rosabal (CUB); W 5–2	12
Rania Herlina Rahardja	Girls’ Épée	Jaqman (PLE); W 5–2	Holmes (USA); L 3–5	Lin (CHN); L 2–5	Santuccio (ITA); L 1–5	Swatowska (POL); L 2–5	Brunner (SUI); L 3–4	12
Ye Ying Liane Wong	Girls’ Foil	Barrera (ESA); W 5–2	Choi (KOR); L 1–5	Lupkovics (HUN); L 1–5	Wang (CHN); W 5–1	Cellerova (SVK); W 5–1		6

Knock-Out Stage

Athlete	Event	Round of 16	Quarterfinals	Semifinals	Final	Rank
Wei Hao Lim	Boys’ Épée	Novotny (CZE); W 15–11	Lyssov (CAN); L 13–15	Did not advance		8
Xian Sin Justin Ong	Boys’ Foil	Lichagin (RUS); L 10–15	Did not advance			12
Rania Herlina Rahardja	Girls’ Épée	Lee (KOR); L 10–15	Did not advance			12
Ye Ying Liane Wong	Girls’ Foil	Barrera (ESA); W 15–12	Alexeeva (RUS); L 5–15	Did not advance		6
Asia-Oceania 1 Ji Yeon Seo (KOR); Byeong Hun Na (KOR); Ye Ying Liane Wong (SIN); Jong Hun Song (KOR); Lin Sheng (CHN); Kwang Hyun Lee (KOR)	Mixed Team		Europe 4 W 30–24	Europe 2 L 27–30	Americas 1 L 24–30	4

== Field hockey ==
Squad List	Event	Group Stage		5th Place Match	
Squad List	Event	Opposition Score	Rank	Opposition Score	Rank
Samudra Pang Chian Ong; Rui-Ming Kevin Ng; Shahid Manap; Mohammad Haseef Salim; Abdul Rahim Abdul Rashid; Nur Ashriq Ferdaus Zulkepli (C); Muhammad Zulfadhli Jasni Ismail; Rahmat Abdul Jalil; Silas Abdul Razak Noor Shah; Mohammad Fadzly Mohamed Adam; Muhammad Fadhil Muhammad Rizaini; Muhammad Amirul Asyraf Abdul Aziz; Muhammad Hidayat Mat Rahim; Karleef Sasi Abdullah; Muhammad Shafiq Abdul Rashid; Muhammadd Alfien Mohammad Amir; Yuan Jie Ren	Boys' Hockey	Australia; L 1–8	6	Chile; W 6–1	5
Samudra Pang Chian Ong; Rui-Ming Kevin Ng; Shahid Manap; Mohammad Haseef Salim; Abdul Rahim Abdul Rashid; Nur Ashriq Ferdaus Zulkepli (C); Muhammad Zulfadhli Jasni Ismail; Rahmat Abdul Jalil; Silas Abdul Razak Noor Shah; Mohammad Fadzly Mohamed Adam; Muhammad Fadhil Muhammad Rizaini; Muhammad Amirul Asyraf Abdul Aziz; Muhammad Hidayat Mat Rahim; Karleef Sasi Abdullah; Muhammad Shafiq Abdul Rashid; Muhammadd Alfien Mohammad Amir; Yuan Jie Ren	Boys' Hockey	Belgium; L 1–7	6	Chile; W 6–1	5
Samudra Pang Chian Ong; Rui-Ming Kevin Ng; Shahid Manap; Mohammad Haseef Salim; Abdul Rahim Abdul Rashid; Nur Ashriq Ferdaus Zulkepli (C); Muhammad Zulfadhli Jasni Ismail; Rahmat Abdul Jalil; Silas Abdul Razak Noor Shah; Mohammad Fadzly Mohamed Adam; Muhammad Fadhil Muhammad Rizaini; Muhammad Amirul Asyraf Abdul Aziz; Muhammad Hidayat Mat Rahim; Karleef Sasi Abdullah; Muhammad Shafiq Abdul Rashid; Muhammadd Alfien Mohammad Amir; Yuan Jie Ren	Boys' Hockey	Pakistan; L 1–4	6	Chile; W 6–1	5
Samudra Pang Chian Ong; Rui-Ming Kevin Ng; Shahid Manap; Mohammad Haseef Salim; Abdul Rahim Abdul Rashid; Nur Ashriq Ferdaus Zulkepli (C); Muhammad Zulfadhli Jasni Ismail; Rahmat Abdul Jalil; Silas Abdul Razak Noor Shah; Mohammad Fadzly Mohamed Adam; Muhammad Fadhil Muhammad Rizaini; Muhammad Amirul Asyraf Abdul Aziz; Muhammad Hidayat Mat Rahim; Karleef Sasi Abdullah; Muhammad Shafiq Abdul Rashid; Muhammadd Alfien Mohammad Amir; Yuan Jie Ren	Boys' Hockey	Chile; L 1–2	6	Chile; W 6–1	5
Samudra Pang Chian Ong; Rui-Ming Kevin Ng; Shahid Manap; Mohammad Haseef Salim; Abdul Rahim Abdul Rashid; Nur Ashriq Ferdaus Zulkepli (C); Muhammad Zulfadhli Jasni Ismail; Rahmat Abdul Jalil; Silas Abdul Razak Noor Shah; Mohammad Fadzly Mohamed Adam; Muhammad Fadhil Muhammad Rizaini; Muhammad Amirul Asyraf Abdul Aziz; Muhammad Hidayat Mat Rahim; Karleef Sasi Abdullah; Muhammad Shafiq Abdul Rashid; Muhammadd Alfien Mohammad Amir; Yuan Jie Ren	Boys' Hockey	Ghana; L 1–2	6	Chile; W 6–1	5

== Football ==
Squad List	Event	Group Stage		Semifinal	Bronze Medal Match	Rank
Squad List	Event	Group D	Rank	Semifinal	Bronze Medal Match	Rank
Fashah Rosedin; Firdaus Sham; Radhi Kasim; Irfan Asyraf; Jeffrey Lightfoot (C); Ammirul Emmran; Brandon Koh; Iskander Khairul; Syazwan Zin; Hanafi Akbar; Jonathan Tan; Sunny Ng; Hazim Hassan; Illyas Lee; Bryan Neubronner; Dhukhilan Jeevamani; Muhaimin Suhaimi; Hamzah Fazil	Boys' Football	Zimbabwe; W 3–1	1 Q	Haiti; L 0–2	Montenegro; W 4–1	Bronze medal
Fashah Rosedin; Firdaus Sham; Radhi Kasim; Irfan Asyraf; Jeffrey Lightfoot (C); Ammirul Emmran; Brandon Koh; Iskander Khairul; Syazwan Zin; Hanafi Akbar; Jonathan Tan; Sunny Ng; Hazim Hassan; Illyas Lee; Bryan Neubronner; Dhukhilan Jeevamani; Muhaimin Suhaimi; Hamzah Fazil	Boys' Football	Montenegro; W 3–2	1 Q	Haiti; L 0–2	Montenegro; W 4–1	Bronze medal

== Gymnastics ==
=== Artistic Gymnastics ===
Boys

Athlete	Event	Floor		Pommel Horse		Rings		Vault		Parallel Bars		Horizontal Bar		Total	
Athlete	Event	Score	Rank	Score	Rank	Score	Rank	Score	Rank	Score	Rank	Score	Rank	Score	Rank
Timothy Tay	Boys' Qualification	13.200	29	11.550	34	12.250	33	14.100	38	12.150	31	12.100	37	75.350	36

Girls

Athlete	Event	Vault		Uneven Bars		Beam		Floor		Total	
Athlete	Event	Score	Rank	Score	Rank	Score	Rank	Score	Rank	Score	Rank
Pei Shi Rachel Giam	Girls' Qualification	12.650	30	9.150	38	12.250	39	11.800	30	45.850	34

=== Rhythmic Gymnastics ===
Team

Athlete	Event	Qualification				Final			
Athlete	Event	Hoops	Ribbons	Total	Rank	Hoops	Ribbons	Total	Rank
Shing Eng Chia; Miki Erika Nomura; Yi Lin Phaan; Kwee Peng Ann Sim	Girls' Group All-Around	19.600	19.550	39.150	5	Did not advance			

== Handball ==
Squad List	Event	Group Stage		5th Place Playoffs		Rank
Squad List	Event	Group B	Rank	Match 1	Match 2	Rank
Izzat Hashim Siraj; Chin An Clement Choong; Junhao Oscar Ooi; Pritpal Singh; Ryan Su-Shien Goh; Jason Jun Jie Tan; Ze Jun Wilmer Tay; Wen Wei Tow; Arun Vinoth Perumal Pillay; Ervin Sethi; Eugene Zhi Jun Foo; Muhammad Zahin Mazali; Jun Ting Alvin Low; Jing Li Koh	Boys' Handball	Egypt; L 7–50	3	Cook Islands; W 27–20	Cook Islands; W 32–18	5
Izzat Hashim Siraj; Chin An Clement Choong; Junhao Oscar Ooi; Pritpal Singh; Ryan Su-Shien Goh; Jason Jun Jie Tan; Ze Jun Wilmer Tay; Wen Wei Tow; Arun Vinoth Perumal Pillay; Ervin Sethi; Eugene Zhi Jun Foo; Muhammad Zahin Mazali; Jun Ting Alvin Low; Jing Li Koh	Boys' Handball	Brazil; L 7–53	3	Cook Islands; W 27–20	Cook Islands; W 32–18	5

== Judo ==
Individual

Athlete	Event	Round 1	Round 2	Round 3	Semifinals	Final	Rank
Athlete	Event	Opposition Result	Opposition Result	Opposition Result	Opposition Result	Opposition Result	Rank
Chin Jie Lim	Boys' −81 kg	Ntanatsidis (GRE); L 000–100	Repechage; Dedeic (MNE); L 000–021	Did not advance			13
Jing Fang Tang	Girls' −52 kg	Dmitrieva (RUS); L 000–110	Repechage; Geldybayeva (TKM); L 000–100	Did not advance			9

Team

Team	Event	Round 1	Round 2	Semifinals	Final	Rank
Team	Event	Opposition Result	Opposition Result	Opposition Result	Opposition Result	Rank
Birmingham; Fahariya Takidine (COM); Ecaterina Guica (CAN); Song Chol Hyon (PRK); Neo Kapenko (BOT); Chin Jie Lim (SIN); Kadijah Maxwell (BAR); Krisztian Toth (HUN)	Mixed Team	Cairo; L 2–5	Did not advance			9
Osaka; Sothea Sam (CAM); Abdulrahman Anter (YEM); Jing Fang Tang (SIN); Brandon Arends (ARU); Laura Naginskaite (LTU); Alexios Ntanatsidis (GRE); Natalia Kubin (GER); Bruno Abel Villalba (ARG)	Mixed Team	Barcelona; W 5–3	Belgrade; L 4–4 (1–3)	Did not advance		5

== Modern pentathlon ==
Athlete	Event	Fencing (Épée One Touch)			Swimming (200m Freestyle)			Running & Shooting (3000m, Laser Pistol)			Total Points	Final Rank
Athlete	Event	Results	Rank	Points	Time	Rank	Points	Time	Rank	Points	Total Points	Final Rank
Valerie Lim	Girls' Individual	5–18	24	560	2:26.23	15	1048	13:20.91	13	1800	3408	18
Valerie Lim (SIN); Yuriy Fedechko (UKR)	Mixed Relay	36–56	21	720	2:04.24	8	1312	15:13.54	2	2428	4460	7

== Rowing ==
Athlete	Event	Heats		Repechage		Semifinals		Final		Overall Rank
Athlete	Event	Time	Rank	Time	Rank	Time	Rank	Time	Rank	Overall Rank
Naszrie Hyckell Hamzah	Boys' Single Sculls	3:40.00	5 QR	3:44.10	5 QC/D	3:55.80	5 QD	3:56.66	2	19
Joanna Lai Cheng Chan	Girls' Single Sculls	4:04.54	4 QR	4:12.77	4 QC/D	4:19.58	4 QD	4:12.58	1	18

== Sailing ==
One Person Dinghy

Athlete	Event	Race												Points	Rank
Athlete	Event	1	2	3	4	5	6	7	8	9	10	11	M*	Points	Rank
Darren Wong Loong Choy	Boys' Byte CII	10	7	~~24~~	2	9	3	3	4	15	13	~~18~~	12	78	7
Natasha Michiko Yokoyama	Girls' Byte CII	6	7	~~23~~	6	4	1	~~20~~	6	20	1	12	3	66	5

Windsurfing

Athlete	Event	Race											Points	Rank
Athlete	Event	1	2	3	4	5	6	7	8	9	10	M*	Points	Rank
Audrey Pei Lin Yong	Girls' Techno 293	4	1	4	~~8~~	4	2	7	6	4	8	3	43	Bronze medal

== Shooting ==
Pistol

Athlete	Event	Qualification		Final		
Athlete	Event	Score	Rank	Score	Total	Rank
Wen Yi Wu	Boys' 10m Air Pistol	546	18	Did not advance		

Rifle

Athlete	Event	Qualification		Final		
Athlete	Event	Score	Rank	Score	Total	Rank
Shang Hui Carol Lee	Girls' 10m Air Rifle	393	6 Q	100.2	493.2	7

== Swimming ==
Boys

Athletes	Event	Heat		Semifinal		Final	
Athletes	Event	Time	Position	Time	Position	Time	Position
Clement Lim	Boys’ 50m Freestyle	23.86	14 Q	23.87	14	Did not advance	
Clement Lim	Boys’ 100m Freestyle	51.40	7 Q	51.75	13	Did not advance	
Clement Lim	Boys’ 200m Freestyle	1:52.17	10			Did not advance	
Clement Lim	Boys’ 400m Freestyle	4:04.24	15			Did not advance	
Arren Quek	Boys’ 50m Freestyle	24.03	19	Did not advance			
Arren Quek	Boys’ 100m Freestyle	52.69	28	Did not advance			
Arren Quek	Boys’ 200m Freestyle	1:57.62	30			Did not advance	
Rainer Kai Wee Ng	Boys’ 50m Backstroke			26.37	2 Q	26.37	Silver medal
Rainer Kai Wee Ng	Boys’ 100m Backstroke	57.50	8 Q	57.44	9	Did not advance	
Rainer Kai Wee Ng	Boys’ 200m Backstroke	2:06.74	11			Did not advance	
Rainer Kai Wee Ng	Boys’ 100m Butterfly	57.06	21	Did not advance			
Sheng Jun Pang	Boys’ 50m Breaststroke	30.36	10 Q	30.11	10	Did not advance	
Sheng Jun Pang	Boys’ 100m Breaststroke	1:06.46	21	Did not advance			
Sheng Jun Pang	Boys’ 50m Butterfly	25.63	10 Q	DSQ		Did not advance	
Sheng Jun Pang	Boys’ 100m Butterfly	57.08	22	Did not advance			
Sheng Jun Pang	Boys’ 200m Individual Medley	2:06.65	16			Did not advance	
Arren Quek; Sheng Jun Pang; Rainer Kai Wee Ng; Clement Lim	Boys’ 4x100m Freestyle Relay	3:28.66	7 Q			3:27.47	7
Arren Quek; Sheng Jun Pang; Rainer Kai Wee Ng; Clement Lim	Boys’ 4x100m Medley Relay	3:52.89	10			Did not advance	

Girls

Athletes	Event	Heat		Semifinal		Final	
Athletes	Event	Time	Position	Time	Position	Time	Position
Amanda Lim	Girls’ 50m Freestyle	26.61	8 Q	26.14	6 Q	26.05	6
Amanda Lim	Girls’ 100m Freestyle	58.03	12 Q	57.99	11	Did not advance	
Amanda Lim	Girls’ 200m Freestyle	2:04.68	13			Did not advance	
Amanda Lim	Girls’ 50m Butterfly	29.48	16 Q	29.34	16	Did not advance	
Adeline Winata	Girls’ 100m Freestyle	1:00.64	38	Did not advance			
Adeline Winata	Girls’ 200m Freestyle	2:12.69	37			Did not advance	
Adeline Winata	Girls’ 50m Backstroke	31.43	15 Q	31.48	15	Did not advance	
Adeline Winata	Girls’ 100m Backstroke	1:08.06	30	Did not advance			
Adeline Winata	Girls’ 200m Backstroke	2:27.49	31			Did not advance	
Chriselle Koh	Girls’ 400m Freestyle	4:34.28	22			Did not advance	
Chriselle Koh	Girls’ 100m Backstroke	1:09.93	35	Did not advance			
Chriselle Koh	Girls’ 200m Backstroke	2:25.81	28			Did not advance	
Cheryl Lim	Girls’ 50m Breaststroke	33.82	16 Q	33.65	15	Did not advance	
Cheryl Lim	Girls’ 100m Breaststroke	1:14.38	21	Did not advance			
Cheryl Lim	Girls’ 200m Breaststroke	2:40.23	14			Did not advance	
Amanda Lim; Adeline Winata; Chriselle Koh; Cheryl Lim	Girls’ 4x100m Freestyle Relay	4:01.27	8 Q			4:00.43	8
Amanda Lim; Adeline Winata; Chriselle Koh; Cheryl Lim	Girls’ 4x100m Medley Relay	4:28.56	10			Did not advance	

Mixed

Athletes	Event	Heat		Semifinal		Final	
Athletes	Event	Time	Position	Time	Position	Time	Position
Clement Lim; Arren Quek; Amanda Lim; Adeline Winata	Mixed 4x100m Freestyle Relay	3:42.88	12			Did not advance	
Rainer Kai Wee; Cheryl Lim; Sheng Jun Pang; Adeline Winata	Mixed 4x100m Medley Relay	4:08.94	12			Did not advance	

== Table tennis ==
Individual

Athlete	Event	Round 1		Round 2		Quarterfinals	Semifinals	Final	Rank
Athlete	Event	Group Matches	Rank	Group Matches	Rank	Quarterfinals	Semifinals	Final	Rank
Zhe Yu Clarence Chew	Boys' Singles	Massah (MAW); W 3–0 (11–3, 11–2, 11–5)	2 Q	Soderlund (SWE); W 3–1 (9–11, 11–6, 11–9, 11–8)	4	Did not advance			13
Zhe Yu Clarence Chew	Boys' Singles	Hung (TPE); L 0–3 (6–11, 4–11, 8–11)	2 Q	Leitgeb (AUT); L 2–3 (11–9, 8–11, 8–11, 11–5, 3–11)	4	Did not advance			13
Zhe Yu Clarence Chew	Boys' Singles	Hmam (TUN); W 3–1 (11–7, 11–9, 11–13, 11–8)	2 Q	Onaolapo (NGR); L 2–3 (9–11, 11–8, 4–11 11–6, 7–11)	4	Did not advance			13
Isabelle Siyun Li	Girls' Singles	Loveridge (GBR); W 3–0 (14–12, 11–1, 11–3)	2 Q	Yang (KOR); L 0–3 (8–11, 5–11, 5–11)	2 Q	Szocs (ROU); W 4–1 (11–8, 5–11, 11–5, 11–8, 11–7)	Sawettabut (THA); W 4–0 (11–9, 11–6, 11–6, 11–9)	Gu (CHN); L 0–4 (8–11, 5–11, 8–11, 9–11)	Silver medal
Isabelle Siyun Li	Girls' Singles	Tanioka (JPN); L 2–3 (9–11, 5–11, 11–9, 18–16, 6–11)	2 Q	Hsing (USA); W 3–1 (10–12, 11–5, 11–4, 11–9)	2 Q	Szocs (ROU); W 4–1 (11–8, 5–11, 11–5, 11–8, 11–7)	Sawettabut (THA); W 4–0 (11–9, 11–6, 11–6, 11–9)	Gu (CHN); L 0–4 (8–11, 5–11, 8–11, 9–11)	Silver medal
Isabelle Siyun Li	Girls' Singles	Wu (NZL); W 3–0 (11–3, 11–2, 11–5)	2 Q	Jeger (CRO); W 3–0 (11–8, 11–6, 11–8)	2 Q	Szocs (ROU); W 4–1 (11–8, 5–11, 11–5, 11–8, 11–7)	Sawettabut (THA); W 4–0 (11–9, 11–6, 11–6, 11–9)	Gu (CHN); L 0–4 (8–11, 5–11, 8–11, 9–11)	Silver medal

Team

Athlete	Event	Round 1		Round 2	Quarterfinals	Semifinals	Final	Rank
Athlete	Event	Group Matches	Rank	Round 2	Quarterfinals	Semifinals	Final	Rank
Singapore; Isabelle Li (SIN); Zhe Yu Clarence Chew (SIN)	Mixed Team	Intercontinental 2 Noskova (RUS); Holikov (UZB); W 2–1 (2–3, 3–0, 3–1)	1 Q	Europe 4 Bliznet (MDA); Kulpa (POL); W 2–0 (3–0, 3–1)	Japan; Tanioka (JPN); Niwa (JPN); L 1–2 (3–0, 1–3, 2–3)	Did not advance		5
Singapore; Isabelle Li (SIN); Zhe Yu Clarence Chew (SIN)	Mixed Team	Egypt; Meshref (EGY); Bedair (EGY); W 3–0 (3–0, 3–1, 3–1)	1 Q	Europe 4 Bliznet (MDA); Kulpa (POL); W 2–0 (3–0, 3–1)	Japan; Tanioka (JPN); Niwa (JPN); L 1–2 (3–0, 1–3, 2–3)	Did not advance		5
Singapore; Isabelle Li (SIN); Zhe Yu Clarence Chew (SIN)	Mixed Team	Africa 1 Laid (ALG); Onaolapo (NGR); W 2–1 (3–0, 1–3, 3–0)	1 Q	Europe 4 Bliznet (MDA); Kulpa (POL); W 2–0 (3–0, 3–1)	Japan; Tanioka (JPN); Niwa (JPN); L 1–2 (3–0, 1–3, 2–3)	Did not advance		5

== Taekwondo ==
On 16 August 2010, Daryl Tan secured Singapore's first medal at the YOG, winning bronze in the Boys' Under-55 kg taekwondo event at the Suntec International Convention Centre. Kaveh Rezaei of Iran, the World Junior champion, won 12 – 0.

Suntec International Convention Centre, Tuesday, August 17, 2010 — Shafinas Abdul Rahman secured a bronze — Singapore’s second medal at the Games — after losing her bout to Nguyen Thanh Thao of Vietnam in the women’s 55 kg Taekwondo semi-final.

Athlete	Event	Preliminary	Quarterfinal	Semifinal	Final	Rank
Jia Jun Daryl Tan	Boys' −55kg	BYE	Naing Dwe Shien Shien (MYA); W 6–5	Kaveh Rezaei (IRI); L RSC R3 1:33	Did not advance	Bronze medal
Jia Zhe Christopher Lee	Boys' −73kg	BYE	Jin Hak Kim (KOR); L 1–12	Did not advance		5
Nur Zakirah Zakaria	Girls' −49kg	BYE	Melanie Phan (CAN); L 6–15	Did not advance		5
Shafinas Abdul Rahman	Girls' −55kg	BYE	Kaburee Ioane (KIR); W RSC R1 0:59	Thanh Thao Nguyen (VIE); L 8–9	Did not advance	Bronze medal

== Tennis ==
Singles

Athlete	Event	Round 1	Round 2	Quarterfinals	Semifinals	Final	Rank
Stefanie Tan	Girls' Singles	Gavrilova (RUS); L 0–2 (2–6, 3–6)	Consolation; Jodoin (CAN); L 0–2 (4–6, 5–7)	Did not advance			

Doubles

Athlete	Event	Round 1	Quarterfinals	Semifinals	Final	Rank
Monica Puig (PUR); Stefanie Tan (SIN)	Girls' Doubles	Gavrilova (RUS); Putintseva (RUS); L 0–2 (4–6, 5–7)	Did not advance			

== Triathlon ==
Individual

Triathlete	Event	Swimming	Transit 1	Cycling	Transit 2	Running	Total time	Rank
Wan Qi Clara Wong	Girls	9:58	0:41	47:24	0:34	22:53	1:21:30.85	30
Scott Yiqiang Ang	Boys	9:20	0:32	30:33	0:27	21:23	1:02:15.11	29

Mixed

Athlete	Event	Total Times per Athlete (Swim 250 m, Bike 7 km, Run 1.7 km)	Total Group Time	Rank
Tüvshinjargalyn Enkhjargal (MGL); Kirill Uvarov (KAZ); Mattika Maneekaew (THA); Scott Yiqiang Ang (SIN)	Mixed Team Relay; Asia 3	25:14; 21:02; 25:50; 22:22	1:34:28.69	15
Wan Qi Clara Wong (SIN); Livio Molinari (ITA); Cristina Luizzet Betancourt de Leon (PUR); Boyd Littleford (ZIM)	Mixed Team Relay; World Team 2	22:55; 19:36; 23:40; 21:23	1:27:34.96	12

== Volleyball ==
Squad List	Event	Group Stage		5th Place Match	Rank
Squad List	Event	Group A	Rank	5th Place Match	Rank
Joelle Shu Yu Lim (C); Yi Ting Tan; Yet Ting Dorita Peng; Cassandra Hwee Min Tay; Qian Lin Marylyn Yeo; Kan An Michelle Chia; Ling Ying Loh; Cai Ting Cheryl Chan; Qi Hui Ang; Wei Ting Stephanie Ng; Siew Hoon Seah; Jacqueline Chiang	Girls' Volleyball	Peru; L 0–3 (11–25, 13–25, 12–25)	3	Egypt; L 1–3 (25–20, 18–25, 19–25, 19–25)	6
Joelle Shu Yu Lim (C); Yi Ting Tan; Yet Ting Dorita Peng; Cassandra Hwee Min Tay; Qian Lin Marylyn Yeo; Kan An Michelle Chia; Ling Ying Loh; Cai Ting Cheryl Chan; Qi Hui Ang; Wei Ting Stephanie Ng; Siew Hoon Seah; Jacqueline Chiang	Girls' Volleyball	Japan; L 0–3 (9–25, 16–25, 9–25)	3	Egypt; L 1–3 (25–20, 18–25, 19–25, 19–25)	6

== Weightlifting ==
Athlete	Event	Snatch	Clean & Jerk	Total	Rank
Jamie Emma Wee	Girls' 58kg	52	63	115	8

== Wrestling ==
Freestyle

Athlete	Event	Pools		Final	Rank
Athlete	Event	Groups	Rank	Final	Rank
Kester Chun Yue Leung	Boys' 54kg	Herandez (COL); L T. Fall (0–6, 0–7)	4	7th Place Match; Ghanmi (TUN); L T. Fall (0–7, 0–6)	8
Kester Chun Yue Leung	Boys' 54kg	Lawrence (AUS); L T. Fall (0–6, 0–6)	4	7th Place Match; Ghanmi (TUN); L T. Fall (0–7, 0–6)	8
Kester Chun Yue Leung	Boys' 54kg	Guluyev (AZE); L T. Fall (0–6, 0–7)	4	7th Place Match; Ghanmi (TUN); L T. Fall (0–7, 0–6)	8
Erna Natasha Puteri	Girls' 60kg	Burkert (USA); L Fall (0–3)	4	7th Place Match; Ford (NZL); L 0–2 (0–4, 0–4)	8
Erna Natasha Puteri	Girls' 60kg	Ahmed (BUL); L 0–2 (0–4, 0–1)	4	7th Place Match; Ford (NZL); L 0–2 (0–4, 0–4)	8
Erna Natasha Puteri	Girls' 60kg	Dhanda (IND); L Fall (0–6)	4	7th Place Match; Ford (NZL); L 0–2 (0–4, 0–4)	8
