= Palestine at the 2010 Summer Youth Olympics =

- IOC code: PLE
- NOC: Palestine Olympic Committee

in Singapore
- Competitors: 4 in 3 sports
- Flag bearer: Nour Aldin Hammoda

Summer Youth Olympics appearances
- 2010; 2014; 2018

Palestine competed at the 2010 Summer Youth Olympics, the inaugural Youth Olympic Games, held in Singapore from 14 August to 26 August 2010.

== Athletics ==
=== Boys ===
Track and road events

Athletes	Event	Qualification		Final	
Athletes	Event	Result	Rank	Result	Rank
Nour Aldin Hammoda	Boys’ 1000m	2:36.67	18 qB	DNS	

== Fencing ==
Group stage

Athlete	Event	Match 1	Match 2	Match 3	Match 4	Match 5	Match 6	Seed
Damyan Jaqman	Girls’ Épée	Rahardja (SIN); L 2-5	Holmes (USA); L 0-5	Lin (CHN); L 0-5	Santuccio (ITA); L 3-5	Swatowska (POL); L 1-5	Brunner (SUI); L 3-5	13

Knock-out stage

Athlete	Event	Round of 16	Quarterfinals	Semifinals	Final	Rank
Damyan Jaqman	Girls’ Épée	Swatowska (POL); L 4-15	Did not advance			13

== Swimming ==
Athletes	Event	Heat		Semifinal		Final	
Athletes	Event	Time	Position	Time	Position	Time	Position
Fouad Al Atrash	Boys’ 50m Freestyle	26.26	34	Did not advance			
Fouad Al Atrash	Boys’ 50m Backstroke			30.80	14	Did not advance	
Sabine Hazboun	Girls’ 50m Freestyle	29.44	44	Did not advance			
Sabine Hazboun	Girls’ 50m Butterfly	31.88	20	Did not advance			
