= Katelyn Jarrell-Bouyssou =

American judoka (born 1994)

Katelyn Bouyssou-Jarrell
Personal information
- Nationality: American
- Born: 11 June 1994 (age 32)
- Occupation: Judoka

Sport
- Country: United States
- Sport: Judo
- Weight class: –48 kg / –52 kg

Achievements and titles
- World Champ.: R32 (2009, 2010, 2017, 2021)
- Pan American Champ.: (2017, 2021)
Medal record
Women's judo
Representing United States
Pan American Championships
Bronze medal – third place	2017 Panama City	–48 kg
Bronze medal – third place	2021 Guadalajara	–52 kg
IJF Grand Prix
Bronze medal – third place	2017 Cancún	–48 kg
Youth Olympic Games
Gold medal – first place	2010 Singapore	–52 kg

Profile at external databases
- IJF: 49
- JudoInside.com: 47736
- Updated on 21 February 2022

Katelyn Jarrell (born Bouyssou) (born June 11, 1994, in Hope, Rhode Island) is an American national competitor in judo. As a senior competitor she has won three national championships at 48 kg. (in 2008, 2010, and 2015) as well as twice finishing third (in 2008 and 2011). At all three of her appearances at the world judo championships (2009, 2010, and 2017), Bouyssou lost in the first round. Katelyn took a bronze at the Pan American Championships in 2017. She was also the youngest judoka to ever qualify for the Senior National Team. She would win gold at the USA Junior National Olympics. Bouyssou is also an active wrestler. Bouyssou would earn her place on the national team by defeating reigning champion Natalie Lafon. Bouyssou is currently (December 2017) ranked 27th in the world in her weight division.
