= Jordan Mattern =

American swimmer (born 1993)

Personal information
- Full name: Jordan Mattern
- National team: United States
- Born: February 1, 1993 (age 33) Aurora, Colorado
- Height: 1.78 m (5 ft 10 in)
- Weight: 64 kg (141 lb)

Sport
- Sport: Swimming
- Strokes: Freestyle
- Club: Colorado Stars Club
- College team: University of Georgia
- Coach: Todd Schmitz
Medal record
Women's swimming
Representing the United States
World Championships (LC)
Gold medal – first place	2013 Barcelona	4×200 m freestyle

Jordan Mattern (born February 1, 1993) is an American swimmer who specializes in middle-distance freestyle events. At the 2013 World Aquatics Championships in Barcelona, Mattern won a gold medal as a member of the winning U.S. team in the women's 4×200-metre freestyle. She attended the University of Georgia, where she swam for coach Jack Bauerle's Georgia Bulldogs swimming and diving team.

== Personal life ==
Mattern is currently married to fellow UGA Alum and former Olympian, Andrew Gemmell.
