= Lotta Nevalainen =

Finnish swimmer

Personal information
- Born: 6 September 1994 (age 31)

Sport
- Sport: Swimming

Lotta Nevalainen (born 6 September 1994) is a Finnish swimmer. She competed in the women's 100 metre freestyle event at the 2017 World Aquatics Championships.
