= Steve Schmuhl =

American swimmer (born 1993)

Personal information
- Full name: Stephen Thomas Schmuhl
- Nationality: American
- Born: March 1, 1993 (age 33) Denver, Colorado, U.S.
- Height: 6 ft 5 in (196 cm)
- Weight: 190 lb (86 kg)

Sport
- Sport: Swimming
- Strokes: Freestyle, Butterfly, Individual Medley
- Club: Indiana University
- College team: Indiana University

Stephen Thomas Schmuhl (born March 1, 1993, in Denver, Colorado) is an American competitive swimmer who competes in medley events, and was a member of the 2012 FINA World Swimming Championships (25 m) team and the 2010 Summer Youth Olympic Games team.

== Swimming career ==
=== 2008–2010 ===
In 2010, Schmuhl attended the 2010 Summer Youth Olympic Games. He competed in the 100 backstroke, 200 freestyle and 400 medley and 400 freestyle relays. The team placed 5th in the 400 freestyle relay. Schmuhl placed 12th in the 100 backstroke in a time of 57.58.

In 2008 Schmuhl competed at the AT&T Winter Junior National Championships. Schmuhl placed 2nd in the 200 backstroke in a time of 1:46.82 and 100 freestyle in a time of 44.97. Schmuhl also swam in the 200 freestyle. In the prelims he set a junior national meet record of 1:37.70. In the finals, Schmuhl was a time of 1:35.98, which broke Michael Phelps national age group record. That time is the fastest time ever swum by a 15-year-old in the even at the time.

=== 2011–2014 ===
At the 2014 NCAA Men's Swimming and Diving Championships, he placed 4th in the 400 IM and recorded top 8 finishes in the 200 fly and 200 IM as well. In September 2013, Schmuhl was named to the USA Swimming National Team in the 200 and 400 IM after finishing among the top six American times. Schmuhl notably placed 2nd in the 200 butterfly at the B1G Championships and 5th at the 2013 NCAA Men's Swimming and Diving Championships in a new Indiana University school record time of 3:41,98.

In 2013 Schmuhl was part of the Indiana University Relay Rally that set several world records. Schmuhl held the world record in the 400m Mixed Freestyle relay until it was broken by another team.

At the 2012 FINA World Swimming Championships (25 m), he placed 12th in the 400 Individual Medley, in a time of 4:10.38.

At the 2012 United States Olympic Trials (swimming) Schmuhl placed 11th in the 400 IM in a time of 4:21.78. Schmuhl also competed in the 200 freestyle, 200 backstroke, 200 IM, 200 butterfly, 100 butterfly, and 100 backstroke.

At the 2012 NCAA Men's Swimming and Diving Championships Schmuhl placed 14th in the 200 butterfly with a time of 1:45.06. In preliminary heats, Schmuhl swam a time of 1:44.44, the 4th fastest time in Indiana Hoosiers swimming history. That swim earned Schmuhl All-American honors. Schmuhl also earned All-American honors in the 200 and 400 medley relays.

Schmuhl was a student-athlete at Indiana University training under coaches Ray Looze and Mike Westphal. Schmuhl began attending Indiana University in the fall of 2011. He was a marketing major in the Kelley School of Business.

=== 2019 ===
In 2019, Schmuhl ranked 2nd in the FINA Masters World Rankings, Age 25 - 29 in the 100 meter butterfly with a time of 56.58. He won the United States Masters National Championships in Mission Viejo, California in the 100 butterfly.

== Personal life ==
Schmuhl is the son of Larry and Pamela Schmuhl. His father Larry is the owner of Blackjack Pizza. He grew up in The Pinery, Colorado. In 2004, Schmuhl moved to Broomfield, Colorado, with his family. He swam at the Boulder Swim Club in high school. Schmuhl attended Legacy High School (Broomfield, Colorado). He swam for the Legacy Lightning high school swim team in 2008 and 2009. In those years, he was state champion and in 2008 he was named Denver Post "Swimmer of the Year". His father competed in track and field events for the University of Northern Colorado. Schmuhl has two brothers, including an identical twin brother, Timothy, who ran track at Colorado State University.
