= China at the 2010 Summer Youth Olympics =

- IOC code: CHN
- NOC: Chinese Olympic Committee
- Website: www.olympic.cn (in Chinese and English)

in Singapore
- Competitors: 68 in 19 sports
- Flag bearer: Huang Yuxiang
- Medals Ranked 1st: Gold 30 Silver 16 Bronze 5 Total 51

Summer Youth Olympics appearances (overview)
- 2010; 2014; 2018

China participated in the 2010 Summer Youth Olympics in Singapore. The Chinese Team consisted of 68 athletes competing in 19 sports.

At the closing ceremony, a Chinese segment was shown as Nanjing was the next host city of the youth games which was held in 2014.

== Medalists ==
Medal	Name	Sport	Event	Date
Gold	Dai Jun	Swimming	Youth men's 400m freestyle	15 Aug
Gold	Tian Yuan	Weightlifting	Youth women's 48kg	15 Aug
Gold	Sun Bowei, Tang Yi, Liu Lan, He Jianbin	Swimming	Mixed 4 × 100 m freestyle relay	15 Aug
Gold	He Jianbin	Swimming	Youth men's 100m backstroke	16 Aug
Gold	Bai Anqi	Swimming	Youth women's 200m backstroke	17 Aug
Gold	Deng Wei	Weightlifting	Youth women's 58kg	17 Aug
Gold	Tang Yi	Swimming	Youth women's 100m freestyle	17 Aug
Gold	Lin Sheng	Fencing	Cadet Female épée	17 Aug
Gold	Tang Yi	Swimming	Youth women's 200m freestyle	18 Aug
Gold	Liu Lan	Swimming	Youth women's 50m butterfly	18 Aug
Gold	Liu Lan, Bai Anqi, Wang Chang, Tang Yi	Swimming	Youth women's 4 × 100 m freestyle relay	19 Aug
Gold	Zheng Shuyin	Taekwondo	Youth women's +63kg	19 Aug
Gold	Liu Chang	Taekwondo	Youth men's +73kg	19 Aug
Gold	Dong Yu	Gymnastics	Youth women's trampoline	20 Aug
Gold	Tang Yi	Swimming	Youth women's 50m freestyle	20 Aug
Gold	Liu Lan	Swimming	Youth women's 100m butterfly	20 Aug
Gold	He Jianbin, Wang Ximing, Liu Lan, Tang Yi	Swimming	Mixed 4 × 100 m medley relay	20 Aug
Gold	Hao Cheng Tang, Zheng Saisai	Tennis	Women's doubles	21 Aug
Gold	Liu Jiao	Diving	Youth women's 10m platform	21 Aug
Gold	Gao Ting Jie	Shooting	Men's 10m air rifle	22 Aug
Gold	Tan Sixin	Gymnastics	Women's balance beam	22 Aug
Gold	Tan Sixin	Gymnastics	Women's floor exercise	22 Aug
Gold	Xie Zhenye	Athletics	Boys' 200m	22 Aug
Gold	Qiu Bo	Diving	Youth men's 3m springboard	22 Aug
Gold	Ma Xueya, Shen Yi, Jin Jiabao, Yang Xi	Basketball	Girls' Final	23 Aug
Gold	Gu Yuting	Table tennis	Women's singles	23 Aug
Gold	Liu Binbin	Athletics	Boys' hammer throw	23 Aug
Gold	Liu Jiao	Diving	Youth women's 3m springboard	23 Aug
Gold	Qiu Bo	Diving	Youth men's 10m platform	24 Aug
Gold	Wang Xiaodong	Canoeing	C1 obstacle canoe slalom men	25 Aug
Silver	Xie Jiawu	Weightlifting	Youth men's 56kg	15 Aug
Silver	Yuan Yuan	Wrestling	Youth women's 52kg	16 Aug
Silver	Bai Anqi	Swimming	Youth women's 100m backstroke	16 Aug
Silver	Gong Xingbin	Weightlifting	Youth men's 69kg	17 Aug
Silver	Sun Bowei, Dai Jun, Wang Ximing, He Jianbin	Swimming	Youth men's 4 × 100 m freestyle relay	17 Aug
Silver	Tan Sixin	Gymnastics	Youth Girls artistic individual all-around	19 Aug
Silver	Deng Xuan	Badminton	Youth Girls' singles badminton	19 Aug
Silver	Zheng Saisai	Tennis	Youth women's singles	20 Aug
Silver	He Yuxiang	Gymnastics	Youth men's trampoline	20 Aug
Silver	Zhengyang Xu	Equestrian	Team jumping	20 Aug
Silver	Mao Yanxue	Athletics	Girls' 5km walk	21 Aug
Silver	Wang Dongqiang	Athletics	Boys' 110m hurdles	21 Aug
Silver	Tan Sixin	Gymnastics	Youth Girls uneven bars	21 Aug
Silver	Jieyi Huang	Canoeing	K1 head-to-head canoe sprint women	22 Aug
Silver	Gu Siyu	Athletics	Girls' shot put	22 Aug
Silver	Fang Xue	Shooting	10m air pistol women junior	23 Aug
Silver	Fu Haitao	Athletics	Boys' triple jump	23 Aug
Silver	Wenjing Zhu	Modern Pentathlon	Mixed relay	24 Aug
Bronze	Liu Lan	Swimming	Youth women's 200m butterfly	16 Aug
Bronze	Zhu Xiaodong	Gymnastics	Youth men's artistic individual all-around	18 Aug
Bronze	Zhu Xiaodong	Gymnastics	Youth men's floor exercise	21 Aug
Bronze	Zhu Xiaodong	Gymnastics	Youth men's horizontal bar	22 Aug
Bronze	Xia Youlian	Athletics	Girls' hammer throw	23 Aug
Bronze	Gu Yuting	Table Tennis	Mixed team	26 Aug

== Archery ==
Boys

Athlete	Event	Ranking round		Round of 32	Round of 16	Quarterfinals	Semifinals	Final	
Athlete	Event	Score	Seed	Opposition Score	Opposition Score	Opposition Score	Opposition Score	Opposition Score	Rank
Luo Siyue	Boys’ individual	636	7	Todorov (BUL); L 0–6	Did not advance				17

Girls

Athlete	Event	Ranking round		Round of 32	Round of 16	Quarterfinals	Semifinals	Final	
Athlete	Event	Score	Seed	Opposition Score	Opposition Score	Opposition Score	Opposition Score	Opposition Score	Rank
Song Jia	Girls’ individual	619	10	Bozic (SLO); W 6–4	Sichenikova (UKR); W 7–3	Tan (TPE); L 0–6	Did not advance		8

Mixed team

Athlete	Event	Partner	Round of 32	Round of 16	Quarterfinals	Semifinals	Final	
Athlete	Event	Partner	Opposition Score	Opposition Score	Opposition Score	Opposition Score	Opposition Score	Rank
Luo Siyue	Mixed team	Iryna Hul (BLR)	Gobbels (BEL)/ Hajduk (CZE); W 6–2	Sorsa (FIN)/ Tsybzhitov (RUS); W 6–5	Filippi (ITA)/ Karoukin (BLR); L 2–6	Did not advance		8
Song Jia	Mixed team	Lorenzo Pianesi (ITA)	Cheok (SIN)/ Farjat (MEX); W 6–0	Okubo (JPN)/ Ku (TPE); W 6–0	Paraskevopoulou (GRE)/ Rajh (SLO); L 4–6	Did not advance		6

== Athletics ==
=== Boys ===
Track and road events

Athletes	Event	Qualification		Final	
Athletes	Event	Result	Rank	Result	Rank
Xie Zhenye	Boys’ 200m	21.27	1 Q	21.22	Gold medal
Wang Dongqiang	Boys’ 110m hurdles	13.87	6 Q	13.41	Silver medal
Wei Xubao	Boys’ 10km walk			45:33.80	5
Masaki Nashimoto (JPN); Xie Zhenye (CHN); Abdullah Ahmed Abkar (KSA); Dongbaek Choi (KOR)	Boys’ medley relay			1:54.14	5

Field events

Athletes	Event	Qualification		Final	
Athletes	Event	Result	Rank	Result	Rank
Li Meng	Boys’ shot put	20.18	6 Q	20.25	7
Liu Binbin	Boys’ hammer throw	70.33	5 Q	73.99	Gold medal
Haibing Huang	Boys’ long jump	7.51	3 Q	6.95	8
Fu Haitao	Boys’ Triple Jump	15.43	4 Q	16.14	Silver medal

=== Girls ===
Track and road events

Athletes	Event	Qualification		Final	
Athletes	Event	Result	Rank	Result	Rank
Zheng Yarong	Girls’ 100m hurdles	13.76	4 Q	13.71	5
Li Lijiao	Girls’ 2000m Steeplechase	6:54.70	4 Q	6:55.20	4
Mao Yanxue	Girls’ 5km walk			22:29.42	Silver medal

Field events

Athletes	Event	Qualification		Final	
Athletes	Event	Result	Rank	Result	Rank
Gu Siyu	Girls’ shot put	15.71	2 Q	15.49	Silver medal
Peng Juanhong	Girls’ javelin throw	40.77	12 qB	44.53	12
Xia Youlian	Girls’ hammer throw	58.00	4 Q	56.62	Bronze medal
Xu Huiqin	Girls’ pole vault	3.90	2 Q	4.10	4

== Badminton ==
Boys

Athlete	Event	Group Stage				Knock-Out Stage			
Athlete	Event	Match 1	Match 2	Match 3	Rank	Quarterfinal	Semifinal	Final	Rank
Huang Yuxiang	Boys’ singles	Elsayad (EGY) W 2–0 (21–9, 21–13)	Fransman (NED) W 2–0 (21–11, 21–14)	Belarbi (ALG) W 2–0 (21–9, 21–11)	1 Q	Poodchalat (THA) L 0–2 (16–21, 19–21)	Did not advance		=5

Girls

Athlete	Event	Group Stage				Knock-Out Stage			
Athlete	Event	Match 1	Match 2	Match 3	Rank	Quarterfinal	Semifinal	Final	Rank
Deng Xuan	Girls’ singles	Winder (PER) W 2–0 (21–12, 21–5)	Cheng (NZL) W 2–0 (21–9, 21–5)	Suwarno (INA) W 2–0 (21–11, 22–20)	1 Q	Marín (ESP) W 2–0 (21–12, 21–19)	Milne (GBR) W 2–0 (21–12, 21–12)	Taerattanachai (THA) L 0–2 (14–21, 17–21)	Silver medal

== Basketball ==
Girls

Squad list	Event	Group Stage		Placement Stage			Rank
Squad list	Event	Group C	Rank	1st–8th	1st–4th	1st–2nd	Rank
Shen Yi (C); Jin Jiabao; Yang Xi; Ma Xueya	Girls' basketball	Thailand; W 34–13	1	Japan; W 26–23	Canada; W 28–21	Australia; W 33–29	Gold medal
Shen Yi (C); Jin Jiabao; Yang Xi; Ma Xueya	Girls' basketball	Mali; W 32–12	1	Japan; W 26–23	Canada; W 28–21	Australia; W 33–29	Gold medal
Shen Yi (C); Jin Jiabao; Yang Xi; Ma Xueya	Girls' basketball	Brazil; W 28–24	1	Japan; W 26–23	Canada; W 28–21	Australia; W 33–29	Gold medal
Shen Yi (C); Jin Jiabao; Yang Xi; Ma Xueya	Girls' basketball	Czech Republic; W 33–19	1	Japan; W 26–23	Canada; W 28–21	Australia; W 33–29	Gold medal

== Canoeing ==
Boys

Athlete	Event	Time Trial		Round 1	Round 2 (Rep)	Round 3	Round 4	Round 5	Final	Rank
Athlete	Event	Time	Rank	Round 1	Round 2 (Rep)	Round 3	Round 4	Round 5	Final	Rank
Wang Xiaodong	Boys’ C1 slalom	1:32.61	1	Volgin (RUS); W 1:33.91-DNF		Chimbumba (ANG); W 1:34.98-2:21.23	Liferi (ROU); W 1:36.07-2:07.68	Melnyk (UKR); W 1:36.60-1:53.81	Soeter (GER); W 1:32.66-1:41.20	Gold medal
Wang Xiaodong	Boys’ C1 sprint	2:02.09	11	Castaneda (MEX); L 2:05.51-1:48.37	Babayan (ARM); W 2:07.19-2:22.45	Tiganu (MDA); L 2:02.75-1:48.70	Did not advance			

Girls

Athlete	Event	Time Trial		Round 1	Round 2 (Rep)	Round 3	Round 4	Round 5	Final	Rank
Athlete	Event	Time	Rank	Round 1	Round 2 (Rep)	Round 3	Round 4	Round 5	Final	Rank
Huang Jieyi	Girls’ K1 slalom	1:58.52	16	Peters (BEL); L 2:05.78-1:46.14	Segal (RSA); W 1:58.94-1:59.67	Did not advance				
Huang Jieyi	Girls’ K1 sprint	1:41.69	3	Zasterova (CZE); W 1:42.66-2:00.73		Hostens (FRA); W 1:42.78-1:51.32	Hryshyna (BLR); W 1:42.71-1:45.94	Monleon (ESP); W 1:43.78-1:50.50	Farkasdi (HUN); L 1:44.73-1:41.26	Silver medal

== Diving ==
Boys

Athlete	Event	Preliminary		Final	
Athlete	Event	Points	Rank	Points	Rank
Qiu Bo	Boys’ 3m springboard	618.75	1 Q	607.15	Gold medal
Qiu Bo	Boys’ 10m platform	643.25	1 Q	673.50	Gold medal

Girls

Athlete	Event	Preliminary		Final	
Athlete	Event	Points	Rank	Points	Rank
Liu Jiao	Girls’ 3m springboard	505.35	1 Q	511.35	Gold medal
Liu Jiao	Girls’ 10m platform	491.45	1 Q	479.60	Gold medal

== Equestrian ==
Athlete	horse	Event	Round 1			Round 2			Total	Jump-Off		Rank
Athlete	horse	Event	Penalties		Rank	Penalties		Rank	Total	Penalties	Time	Rank
Athlete	horse	Event	Jump	Time	Rank	Jump	Time	Rank	Total	Penalties	Time	Rank
Xu Zhengyang	Foxdale Villarni	individual jumping	12	0	23	12	2	26	26			26
Jasmine Zin Man Lai (HKG); Jake Lambert (NZL); Xu Zhengyang (CHN); Sultan Al Tooqi (OMA); Thomas McDermott (AUS)	Butterfly Kisses; Le Lucky; Foxdale Villarni; Joondooree Farms Damiro; Hugo	Team jumping	~~12~~; 0; ~~16~~; 4; 0	~~0~~; 0; ~~0~~; 0; 0	1	4; 0; ~~20~~; ~~4~~; 0	0; 0; ~~0~~; ~~0~~; 0	2	8	0; ~~12~~; 0; 4; ~~8~~	50.57; ~~46.13~~; 51.46; 52.23; ~~46.10~~	Silver medal

== Fencing ==
Group Stage

Athlete	Event	Match 1	Match 2	Match 3	Match 4	Match 5	Match 6	Seed
Lin Sheng	Girls’ épée	Rahardja (SIN); W 5–2	Jaqman (PLE); W 5–0	Holmes (USA); W 5–1	Santuccio (ITA); W 5–2	Swatowska (POL); W 5–4	Brunner (SUI); W 5–1	1
Wang Lianlian	Girls’ foil	Barrera (ESA); W 2–1	Wong (SIN); L 1–5	Choi (KOR); W 4–3	Lupkovics (HUN); W 5–3	Cellerova (SVK); L 0–5		8
Wan Yini	Girls’ sabre	Merza (USA); L 3–5	Nyabileke (COD); W 5–1	Musch (GER); W 5–3	Hilwiyah (IRQ); W 5–4	Wator (POL); W 5–4	Komaschuk (UKR); L 3–5	5

Knock-Out Stage

Athlete	Event	Round of 16	Quarterfinals	Semifinals	Final	Rank
Lin Sheng	Girls’ épée		Radford (GBR); W 15–5	Swatowska (POL); W 15–11	Santuccio (ITA); W 9–8	Gold medal
Wang Lianlian	Girls’ foil	Daw (EGY); W 15–4	Goldie (CAN); L 11–15	Did not advance		8
Wan Yini	Girls’ sabre	Hilwiyah (IRQ); W 15–1	Musch (GER); L 6–15	Did not advance		6
Asia-Oceania 1 Ji Yeon Seo (KOR); Byeong Hun Na (KOR); Ye Ying Liane Wong (SIN); Jong Hun Song (KOR); Lin Sheng (CHN); Kwang Hyun Lee (KOR)	Mixed team		Europe 4 W 30–24	Europe 2 L 27–30	Americas 1 L 24–30	4
Asia-Oceania 2 Wan Yini (CHN); Kirill Zhakupov (KAZ); Wang Lianlian (CHN); Jackson Wang (HKG); Hye Won Lee (KOR); Nicholas Edward Choi (HKG)	Mixed team		Europe 2 L 21–30	5th–8th Europe 4 L 20–30	7th–8th Americas 2 L 27–28	8

== Gymnastics ==
=== Artistic Gymnastics ===
Boys

Athlete	Event	Floor		pommel horse		Rings		vault		parallel Bars		Horizontal Bar		Total	
Athlete	Event	Score	Rank	Score	Rank	Score	Rank	Score	Rank	Score	Rank	Score	Rank	Score	Rank
Zhu Xiaodong	Boys' Qualification	14.600	1 Q	13.600	9	14.200	3 Q	15.900	1	13.650	12	14.150	3 Q	86.100	4 Q
Zhu Xiaodong	Boys' individual all-around	14.300	1	13.550	3	13.600	8	15.700	4	13.750	8	14.100	1	85.000	Bronze medal

Athlete	Event	Score	Rank
Zhu Xiaodong	Boys' Floor	14.300	Bronze medal
Zhu Xiaodong	Boys' Rings	13.775	7
Zhu Xiaodong	Boys' Horizontal Bar	14.100	Bronze medal

Girls

Athlete	Event	vault		uneven bars		Beam		Floor		Total	
Athlete	Event	Score	Rank	Score	Rank	Score	Rank	Score	Rank	Score	Rank
Tan Sixin	Girls' Qualification	14.150	2	14.500	2 Q	15.500	1 Q	13.950	2 Q	58.100	2 Q
Tan Sixin	Girls' individual all-around	14.400	2	14.350	2	15.350	1	14.400	2	58.500	Silver medal

Athlete	Event	Score	Rank
Tan Sixin	Girls' uneven bars	14.125	Silver medal
Tan Sixin	Girls' Beam	15.550	Gold medal
Tan Sixin	Girls' Floor	14.525	Gold medal

=== Rhythmic Gymnastics ===
Individual

Athlete	Event	Qualification						Final					
Athlete	Event	Rope	Hoop	Ball	Clubs	Total	Rank	Rope	Hoop	Ball	Clubs	Total	Rank
Wang Manqin	Girls' individual all-around	20.200	20.700	20.950	20.000	81.850	15	Did not advance					

=== Trampoline ===
Athlete	Event	Qualification				Final	
Athlete	Event	Routine 1	Routine 2	Total	Rank	Routine 1	Rank
He Yuxiang	Boys' Trampoline	28.700	40.100	68.800	1 Q	40.700	Silver medal
Dong Yu	Girls' Trampoline	28.800	39.600	68.400	1 Q	39.900	Gold medal

== Modern pentathlon ==
Athlete	Event	Fencing (épée One Touch)			Swimming (200m freestyle)			Running & Shooting (3000m, Laser Pistol)			Total Points	Final Rank
Athlete	Event	Results	Rank	Points	Time	Rank	Points	Time	Rank	Points	Total Points	Final Rank
Han Jiahao	Boys' individual	12–11	7	840	2:01.49	1	1344	11:52.80	15	2152	4336	11
Zhu Wenjing	Girls' individual	12–11	10	840	2:26.54	16	1044	12:37.04	4	1972	3856	7
Anna Olesinski (USA); Han Jiahao (CHN)	Mixed relay	46–46	11	820	2:04.24	9	1312	15:34.18	6	2344	4476	6
Zhu Wenjing (CHN); Kim Dae-Beom (KOR)	Mixed relay	50–42	6	860	2:02.99	5	1328	15:17.11	3	2412	4600	Silver medal

== Rowing ==
Athlete	Event	Heats		Repechage		Semifinals		Final		Overall Rank
Athlete	Event	Time	Rank	Time	Rank	Time	Rank	Time	Rank	Overall Rank
Zeng Yueqi	Boys' Single Sculls	3:26.64	2 QR	3:27.38	1 QA/B	3:27.38	2 QA	3:24.62	4	4
Ting Cao	Girls' Single Sculls	3:54.83	3 QR	3:56.58	1 QA/B	3:56.61	2 QA	3:55.48	6	6

== Sailing ==
One Person Dinghy

Athlete	Event	Race												Points	Rank
Athlete	Event	1	2	3	4	5	6	7	8	9	10	11	M*	Points	Rank
Wang Zili	Boys' Byte CII	5	~~24~~	12	1	15	~~26~~	22	24	2	5	6	23	115	13
Gu Min	Girls' Byte CII	10	12	~~19~~	2	17	~~DSQ~~	1	9	9	18	1	9	88	8

== Shooting ==
Pistol

Athlete	Event	Qualification		Final			
Athlete	Event	Score	Rank	Score	Total	Shoot-Off	Rank
Jia Xiayong	Boys' 10m air pistol	572	3 Q	97.2	669.2		7
Fang Xue	Girls' 10m air pistol	378	2 Q	93.5	471.5	10.8	Silver medal

Rifle

Athlete	Event	Qualification		Final		
Athlete	Event	Score	Rank	Score	Total	Rank
Gao Ting Jie	Boys' 10m air rifle	594	1 Q	100.9	694.9	Gold medal
Shen Li	Girls' 10m air rifle	390	12	Did not advance		

== Swimming ==
Boys

Athletes	Event	Heat		Semifinal		Final	
Athletes	Event	Time	Position	Time	Position	Time	Position
Dai Jun	Boys' 200m freestyle	1:51.42	5 Q			1:51.66	6
Dai Jun	Boys' 400m freestyle	3:56.63	4 Q			3:50.91	Gold medal
He Jianbin	Boys' 50m freestyle	23.62	10 Q	23.09	4 Q	23.01	4
He Jianbin	Boys' 100m freestyle	51.83	13 Q	50.89	7 Q	50.69	5
He Jianbin	Boys' 100m backstroke	57.18	4 Q	56.10	2 Q	55.16	Gold medal
Sun Bowei	Boys' 50m butterfly	25.52	7 Q	25.12	7 Q	25.20	6
Sun Bowei	Boys' 100m butterfly	55.30	13 Q	54.73	12	Did not advance	
Wang Ximing	Boys' 100m breaststroke	1:05.07	14 Q	1:04.30	8 Q	1:04.55	8
Sun Bowei; Dai Jun; Wang Ximing; He Jianbin	Boys' 4 × 100 m freestyle relay	3:27.11	3 Q			3:24.46	Silver medal
Sun Bowei; Dai Jun; Wang Ximing; He Jianbin	Boys' 4 × 100 m medley relay	3:48.49	5 Q			3:44.51	4

Girls

Athletes	Event	Heat		Semifinal		Final	
Athletes	Event	Time	Position	Time	Position	Time	Position
Bai Anqi	Girls' 100m backstroke	1:03.40	3 Q	1:02.59	2 Q	1:01.97	Silver medal
Bai Anqi	Girls' 200m backstroke	2:14.94	3 Q			2:11.46	Gold medal
Liu Lan	Girls' 50m butterfly	27.81	3 Q	27.15	2 Q	26.97	Gold medal
Liu Lan	Girls' 100m butterfly	1:01.24	5 Q	1:00.28	1 Q	59.67	Gold medal
Liu Lan	Girls' 200m butterfly	2:15.51	8 Q			2:11.94	Bronze medal
Tang Yi	Girls' 50m freestyle	26.00	3 Q	25.68	3 Q	25.40	Gold medal
Tang Yi	Girls' 100m freestyle	57.22	4 Q	56.22	2 Q	54.46	Gold medal
Tang Yi	Girls' 200m freestyle	2:02.48	2 Q			1:58.78	Gold medal
Wang Chang	Girls' 50m breaststroke	33.38	11 Q	33.29	10	Did not advance	
Wang Chang	Girls' 100m breaststroke	1:13.50	17	Did not advance			
Liu Lan; Bai Anqi; Wang Chang; Tang Yi	Girls' 4 × 100 m freestyle relay	3:54.12	1 Q			3:46.64	Gold medal
Liu Lan; Bai Anqi; Wang Chang; Tang Yi	Girls' 4 × 100 m medley relay	4:13.63	4 Q			DSQ	

Mixed

Athletes	Event	Heat		Semifinal		Final	
Athletes	Event	Time	Position	Time	Position	Time	Position
Bai Anqi*; Sun Bowei; Liu Lan; He Jianbin; Tang Yi	Mixed 4 × 100 m freestyle relay	3:39.39	6 Q			3:31.34	Gold medal
Sun Bowei*; Bai Anqi*; Wang Ximing; Tang Yi; Liu Lan; He Jianbin	Mixed 4 × 100 m medley relay	3:56.78	1 Q			3:52.52	Gold medal

- * raced in heats only

== Table tennis ==
Individual

Athlete	Event	Round 1		Round 2		Quarterfinals	Semifinals	Final	Rank
Athlete	Event	Group Matches	Rank	Group Matches	Rank	Quarterfinals	Semifinals	Final	Rank
Gu Yuting	Girls' singles	Bhandarkar (IND); W 3–0 (12–10, 11–2, 11–6)	2 Q	Noskova (RUS); W 3–0 (14–12, 11–9, 11–6)	1 Q	Kim (PRK); W 4–3 (13–11, 10–12, 11–8, 8–11, 8–11, 11–7, 11–6)	Yang (KOR); W 4–1 (11–8, 11–7, 7–11, 11–2)	Li (SIN); W 4–0 (11–8, 11–5, 11–8, 11–9)	Gold medal
Gu Yuting	Girls' singles	Kim (PRK); L 2–3 (8–11, 11–6, 10–12, 11–3, 9–11)	2 Q	Meshref (EGY); W 3–0 (11–9, 11–7, 11–5)	1 Q	Kim (PRK); W 4–3 (13–11, 10–12, 11–8, 8–11, 8–11, 11–7, 11–6)	Yang (KOR); W 4–1 (11–8, 11–7, 7–11, 11–2)	Li (SIN); W 4–0 (11–8, 11–5, 11–8, 11–9)	Gold medal
Gu Yuting	Girls' singles	BYE	2 Q	Tanioka (JPN); W 3–0 (11–2, 11–2, 12–10)	1 Q	Kim (PRK); W 4–3 (13–11, 10–12, 11–8, 8–11, 8–11, 11–7, 11–6)	Yang (KOR); W 4–1 (11–8, 11–7, 7–11, 11–2)	Li (SIN); W 4–0 (11–8, 11–5, 11–8, 11–9)	Gold medal

Team

Athlete	Event	Round 1		Round 2	Quarterfinals	Semifinals	Final	Rank
Athlete	Event	Group Matches	Rank	Round 2	Quarterfinals	Semifinals	Final	Rank
Intercontinental 1 Gu Yuting (CHN); Adem Hmam (TUN)	Mixed team	DPR Korea; Kim (PRK); Kim (PRK); W 2–1 (3–1, 0–3, 3–2)	1 Q	Europe 2 Xiao (POR); Vanrossomme (BEL); W 2–1 (3–0, 2–3, 3–2)	Chinese Taipei; Huang (TPE); Hung (TPE); W 2–1 (3–0, 0–3, 3–1)	Japan; Tanioka (JPN); Niwa (JPN); L 1–2 (3–0, 0–3, 1–3)	DPR Korea; Kim (PRK); Kim (PRK); W 2–1 (3–0, 2–3, 3–1)	Bronze medal
Intercontinental 1 Gu Yuting (CHN); Adem Hmam (TUN)	Mixed team	Netherlands; Eerland (NED); Hageraats (NED); W 2–1 (3–0, 1–3, 3–1)	1 Q	Europe 2 Xiao (POR); Vanrossomme (BEL); W 2–1 (3–0, 2–3, 3–2)	Chinese Taipei; Huang (TPE); Hung (TPE); W 2–1 (3–0, 0–3, 3–1)	Japan; Tanioka (JPN); Niwa (JPN); L 1–2 (3–0, 0–3, 1–3)	DPR Korea; Kim (PRK); Kim (PRK); W 2–1 (3–0, 2–3, 3–1)	Bronze medal
Intercontinental 1 Gu Yuting (CHN); Adem Hmam (TUN)	Mixed team	Pan America 3 Rosheuvel (GUY); Tapia (ECU); W 2–1 (3–0, 1–3, 3–0)	1 Q	Europe 2 Xiao (POR); Vanrossomme (BEL); W 2–1 (3–0, 2–3, 3–2)	Chinese Taipei; Huang (TPE); Hung (TPE); W 2–1 (3–0, 0–3, 3–1)	Japan; Tanioka (JPN); Niwa (JPN); L 1–2 (3–0, 0–3, 1–3)	DPR Korea; Kim (PRK); Kim (PRK); W 2–1 (3–0, 2–3, 3–1)	Bronze medal

== Taekwondo ==
Athlete	Event	Preliminary	Quarterfinal	Semifinal	Final	Rank
Liu Chang	Boys' +73kg		Macho Hungan (INA); W 7–2	Yazan Alsadeq (JOR); W 2–1	Ibrahim Ahmadsei (GER); W 5–4	Gold medal
Li Zhaoyi	Girls' −44kg	BYE	Shukrona Sharifova (TJK); L 1–3	Did not advance		5
Zheng Shuyin	Girls' +63kg	BYE	Adrienne Ivey (USA); W 1–0	Yuleimi Abreu (CUB); W 8–2	Briseida Acosta (MEX); W 2–1	Gold medal

== Tennis ==
singles

Athlete	Event	Round 1	Round 2	Quarterfinals	Semifinals	Final	Rank
Wang Chuhan	Boys' singles	Baluda (RUS); L 0–2 (5–7, 2–6)	Consolation; Krawietz (GER); L 0–2 (5–7, RET)	Did not advance			
Ouyang Bowen	Boys' singles	Patrombon (PHI); W 2–1 (6–7, 6–3, 6–4)	Zsiga (HUN); L 0–2 (4–6, 2–6)	Did not advance			
Tang Haochen	Girls' singles	Rasolomalala (MAD); W 2–0 (6–0, 7–5)	Dinu (ROU); W 2–1 (7–6, 2–6, 6–2)	Gavrilova (RUS); L 0–2 (0–6, 2–6)	Did not advance		
Zheng Saisai	Girls' singles	Puig (PUR); W 2–0 (6–2, 6–4)	Razafimahatratra (MAD); W 2–0 (6–4, 6–2)	Jabeur (TUN); W 2–0 (7–6, 6–2)	Babos (HUN); W 2–0 (6–4, 6–1)	Gavrilova (RUS); L 1–2 (6–2, 2–6, 0–6)	Silver medal

doubles

Athlete	Event	Round 1	Quarterfinals	Semifinals	Final	Rank
Ouyang Bowen (CHN); Wang Chuhan (CHN)	Boys' doubles	Golding (GBR); Vesely (CZE); L 1–2 (3–6, 6–3, [6–10])	Did not advance			
Tang Haochen (CHN); Zheng Saisai (CHN)	Girls' doubles	Erić (SRB); Friedsam (GER); W 2–1 (7–5, 2–6, [13–11])	Dinu (ROU); Jabeur (TUN); W 2–0 (6–2, 6–3)	Babos (HUN); Mestach (BEL); W 2–1 (3–6, 6–3, [10–7])	Čepelová (SVK); Škamlová (SVK); W 2–1 (6–4, 3–6, [10–4])	Gold medal

== Triathlon ==
Girls

Triathlete	Event	Swimming	Transit 1	Cycling	Transit 2	Running	Total time	Rank
Ma Mingxiu	individual	10:06	0:36	35:22	0:30	22:21	1:08:55.96	26

Men's

Athlete	Event	Swim (1.5 km)	Trans 1	Bike (40 km)	Trans 2	Run (10 km)	Total	Rank
Cheng Ru	individual	9:16	0:34	29:26	0:25	17:45	57:26.94	16

Mixed

Athlete	Event	Total times per athlete (swim 250 m, bike 7 km, run 1.7 km)	Total group time	Rank
Mingxiu Ma (CHN); Leong Tim Law (HKG); Karolina Solovyova (KAZ); Yuki Kubono (JPN)	Mixed team relay Asia 2	22:55; 20:43; 23:54; 20:08	1:27:40.62	13
Sato Yuka (JPN); Ji Hong Lee (KOR); Wai Sum Vincci Hui (HKG); Ru Cheng (CHN)	Mixed team relay Asia 1	20:16; 20:06; 22:19; 20:39	1:23:20.88	8

== Weightlifting ==
Athlete	Event	Snatch	Clean & Jerk	Total	Rank
Xie Jiawu	Boys' 56kg	117	137	254	Silver medal
Gong Xingbin	Boys' 69kg	133	160	293	Silver medal
Tian Yuan	Girls' 48kg	85	105	190	Gold medal
Deng Wei	Girls' 58kg	110	132	242	Gold medal

== Wrestling ==
Freestyle

Athlete	Event	Pools		Final	Rank
Athlete	Event	Groups	Rank	Final	Rank
Yuan Yuan	Girls' 52kg	Canon (COL); W 2–0 (3–0, 6–0)	1	Bagomedova (AZE); L 0–2 (2–4, 1–1+)	Silver medal
Yuan Yuan	Girls' 52kg	Nguyen (VIE); W 2–0 (2–0, 4–0)	1	Bagomedova (AZE); L 0–2 (2–4, 1–1+)	Silver medal
Yuan Yuan	Girls' 52kg	Lovik (NOR); W 2–0 (6–0, 2–0)	1	Bagomedova (AZE); L 0–2 (2–4, 1–1+)	Silver medal
