= Malaysia at the Youth Olympics =

- IOC code: MAS
- NOC: Olympic Council of Malaysia
- Website: www.olympic.org.my (in English)
- Medals Ranked 71st: Gold 2 Silver 3 Bronze 1 Total 6

Summer appearances
- 2010; 2014; 2018; 2026

Winter appearances
- 2016; 2020; 2024

Malaysia first participated at the Youth Olympic Games in 2010, and has sent athletes to compete in every Summer Youth Olympic Games. Malaysia made their debut at the Winter Youth Olympic Games in 2016.

== Medal tables ==
=== Medals by Summer Games ===
Games	Athletes	Gold	Silver	Bronze	Total	Rank
Singapore 2010	13	0	2	0	2	65
(China) Nanjing 2014	20	0	1	1	2	64
(Argentina) Buenos Aires 2018	20	2	0	0	2	39
(Senegal) Dakar 2026	12	0	0	0	0	-
Total		2	3	1	6	71

=== Medals by Winter Games ===
Games	Athletes	Gold	Silver	Bronze	Total	Rank
(Austria) Innsbruck 2012	Did not participate					
(Norway) Lillehammer 2016	1	0	0	0	0	-
(Switzerland) Lausanne 2020	2	0	0	0	0	-
(South Korea) Gangwon 2024	Did not participate					
Total		0	0	0	0	−

=== Medals by Summer sport ===
Leading in that sport

Sport	Gold	Silver	Bronze	Total
Badminton	1	0	0	1
Field Hockey	1	0	0	1
Diving	0	3	1	4
Totals (3 entries)	2	3	1	6

=== Medals by Winter Sport ===
Leading in that sport

Sport	Gold	Silver	Bronze	Total
Totals (0 entries)	0	0	0	0

== List of medalists ==
=== Summer Games ===
Medal	Name	Games	Sport	Event
Silver	Pandelela Rinong	2010 Singapore	Diving	Girls' 10 metre platform
Silver	Pandelela Rinong	2010 Singapore	Diving	Girls' 3 metre springboard
Silver	Loh Zhiayi	(China) 2014 Nanjing	Diving	Girls' 10 metre platform
Bronze	Loh Zhiayi	(China) 2014 Nanjing	Diving	Girls' 3 metre springboard
Gold	Goh Jin Wei	(Argentina) 2018 Buenos Aires	Badminton	Girls' singles
Gold	Malaysia's Men’s Hockey 5s team: Hamiz Ahir Shahrul Saupi Amirul Azahar Arif Ishak Syarman Mat Kamaruzaman Kamarudin Muhibuddin Moharam Firdaus Rosdi Akhimullah Anuar	(Argentina) 2018 Buenos Aires	Field hockey	Boys' Tournament

=== Summer Games medalists as part of Mixed-NOCs Team ===
Note: Medals awarded at mixed NOCs events are not counted for the respective country in the overall medal table.

Medal	Name	Games	Sport	Event
Gold	Cheam June Wei	(China) 2014 Nanjing	Badminton	Mixed doubles
Silver	Muhamad Zarif Syahiir Zolkepeli	(China) 2014 Nanjing	Archery	Mixed team
Silver	Rayna Hoh Khai Ling	(Argentina) 2018 Buenos Aires	Gymnastics	Mixed multi-discipline team

== Flag bearers ==
=== Flag bearers by Summer Games ===
Games	Flag bearer	Sport
Singapore 2010	Pandelela Rinong	Diving
(China) Nanjing 2014	Lim Ching Hwang	Swimming
(Argentina) Buenos Aires 2018	Goh Jin Wei	Badminton
(Senegal) Dakar 2026	Shannon Tan Yan Qing; Kai Shen Lim	Swimming; Wushu

=== Flag bearers by Winter Games ===
Games	Flag bearer	Sport
(Norway) Lillehammer 2016	Chew Kai Xiang	Figure skating
(Switzerland) Lausanne 2020	Dione Tan	Short track speed skating

== See also ==
- Malaysia at the Olympics
- Malaysia at the Paralympics
- Malaysia at the Universiade
- Malaysia at the Asian Games
- Malaysia at the Commonwealth Games
