= List of Olympic medalists for Malaysia =

Malaysia at the Olympics
- Flag of Malaysia
- IOC code: MAS
- NOC: Olympic Council of Malaysia
- Medals: Gold 0 Silver 9 Bronze 8 Total 17

Summer appearances
- 1956; 1960; 1964; 1968; 1972; 1976; 1980; 1984; 1988; 1992; 1996; 2000; 2004; 2008; 2012; 2016; 2020; 2024; 2028

Winter appearances
- 2018; 2022; 2026

Other related appearances
- North Borneo (1956)

Malaysia made its debut at the Olympics at the 1956 Summer Olympics but did not gain a medal in its first five participations. The delegation won its first medal when Razif and Jalani Sidek attained a bronze medal in the 1992 Summer Olympics in badminton. The delegation secured its first silver medal in the 1996 Summer Olympics, when Cheah Soon Kit and Yap Kim Hock won an event in badminton. The delegation has never gained a gold medal, being the most successful delegation in the Olympics without one.

== History ==
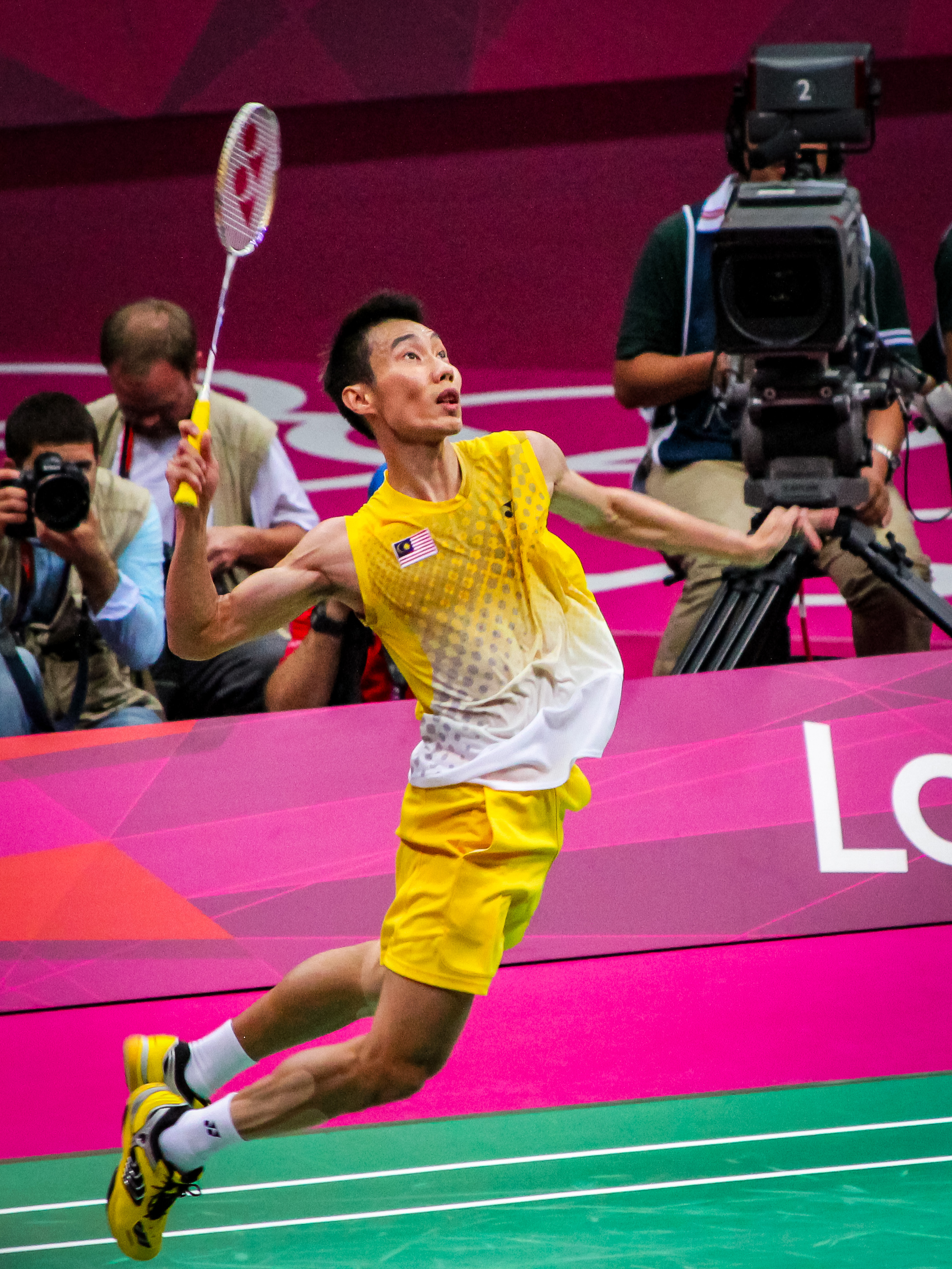
Lee Chong Wei at the 2012 Summer Olympics. Lee has gained three medals for Malaysia.

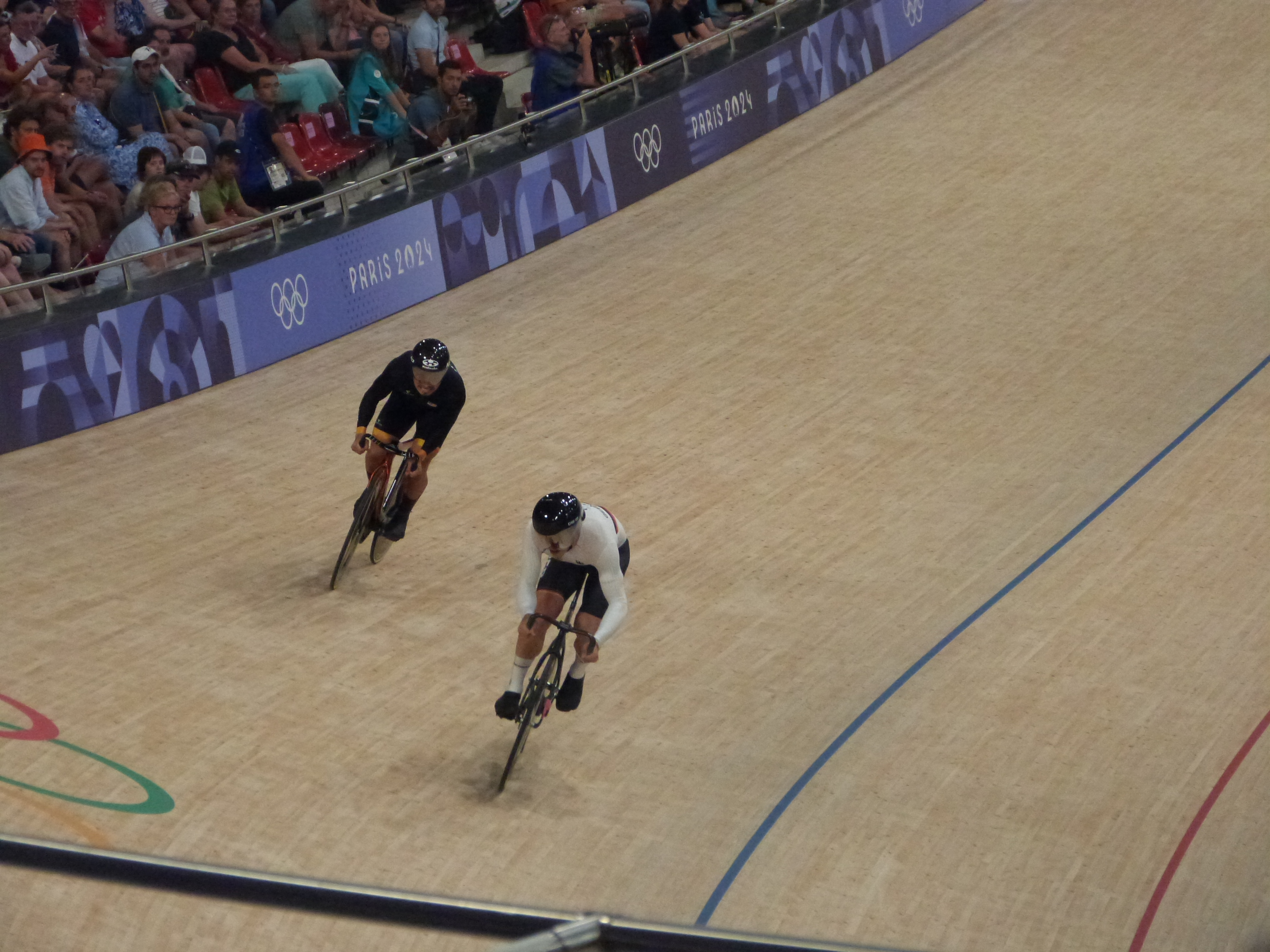
Awang competing at the 2024 Summer Olympics for cycling; he gained the first medal for cycling.

Malaysia debuted in the Olympics at the 1956 Summer Olympics at Melbourne, sending a total of 32 athletes. The newly formed delegation did not achieve a medal in their first five participations. Malaysia gained their first Olympic medal when Razif and Jalani Sidek gained a bronze medal in the 1992 Summer Olympics in badminton. During the 1996 edition, they gained their first silver medal from Cheah Soon Kit and Yap Kim Hock, who participated in badminton, along with another bronze medal gained from Rashid Sidek, the brother of Razif and Jalani. After failing to gain any medals in the 2000 and 2004 Olympics, they gained another silver medal in the 2008 Olympics through Lee Chong Wei in badminton. Wei won another silver in the 2012 Olympic Games; Pandelela Rinong gained Malaysia's first medal in diving, a bronze, that same year. In the 2016 edition, four silver medals and one bronze medal were gained, the most in any participation. Among those medals, the first silver medal for diving, through Rinong, and their first medal for cycling, through Azizulhasni Awang, were earned; Wei won another silver medal. In the 2020 Olympics, a bronze medal and a silver medal were gained; the silver being the first silver medal for cycling through Awang. In the 2024 edition, two bronze medals were earned. The delegation has never gained a gold medal, being the most successful delegation in the Olympics without one.

== List of medalists ==
A total of 16 athletes, 12 of them partaking in pairs, have won eight bronze medals and nine silver medals; they are yet to win their first gold medal.

Medals won at the Summer Olympics
Name(s)	Medal	Sport	Event	Year	Location	Ref.
Razif Sidek Jalani Sidek	Bronze	Badminton	Men's doubles	1992	Barcelona, Spain	
Cheah Soon Kit Yap Kim Hock	Silver	Badminton	Men's doubles	1996	Atlanta, United States	
Rashid Sidek	Bronze	Badminton	Men's singles	1996	Atlanta, United States	
Lee Chong Wei	Silver	Badminton	Men's singles	2008	Beijing, China	
Lee Chong Wei	Silver	Badminton	Men's singles	2012	London, United Kingdom	
Pandelela Rinong	Bronze	Diving	Women's 10 metre platform	2012	London, United Kingdom	
Lee Chong Wei	Silver	Badminton	Men's singles	2016	Rio de Janeiro, Brazil	
Goh V Shem Tan Wee Kiong	Silver	Badminton	Men's doubles	2016	Rio de Janeiro, Brazil	
Chan Peng Soon Goh Liu Ying	Silver	Badminton	Mixed doubles	2016	Rio de Janeiro, Brazil	
Cheong Jun Hoong Pandelela Rinong	Silver	Diving	Women's synchronised 10 metre platform	2016	Rio de Janeiro, Brazil	
Azizulhasni Awang	Bronze	Cycling	Men's keirin	2016	Rio de Janeiro, Brazil	
Azizulhasni Awang	Silver	Cycling	Men's keirin	2020	Tokyo, Japan	
Aaron Chia Soh Wooi Yik	Bronze	Badminton	Men's doubles	2020	Tokyo, Japan	
Aaron Chia Soh Wooi Yik	Bronze	Badminton	Men's doubles	2024	Paris, France	
Lee Zii Jia	Bronze	Badminton	Men's singles	2024	Paris, France	

=== Summer Youth Olympics ===
Five medals have been credited to Malaysia from the Youth Olympic Games: two are gold, three are silver, and one is bronze.

Medals won at the Summer Youth Olympics
Name(s)	Medal	Sport	Event	Year	Location	Ref.
Pandelela Rinong	Silver	Diving	Girls' 10 metre platform	2010	Singapore	
Pandelela Rinong	Silver	Diving	Girls' 3 metre springboard	2010	Singapore	
Loh Zhiayi	Silver	Diving	Girls' 10 metre platform	2014	Nanjing, China	
Loh Zhiayi	Bronze	Diving	Girls' 3 metre springboard	2014	Nanjing, China	
Goh Jin Wei	Gold	Badminton	Girls' singles	2018	Buenos Aires, Argentina	
Hamiz Ahir Shahrul Saupi Amirul Azahar Arif Ishak Syarman Mat Kamaruzaman Kamarudin Muhibuddin Moharam Firdaus Rosdi Akhimullah Anuar	Gold	Field hockey	Boys' tournament	2018	Buenos Aires, Argentina	

== Other medalists ==
=== Mixed-NOCs medalists ===
Malaysia has three medals from participants in a mixed team; the delegation gained one gold medal and two silver medals.

Medals won at the Summer Youth Olympics
Name(s)	Medal	Sport	Event	Year	Location	Ref.
Cheam June Wei with Ng Tsz Yau (Hong Kong)	Gold	Badminton	Mixed doubles	2014	Nanjing, China	
Muhamad Zarif Syahiir Zolkepeli	Silver	Archery	Mixed team	2014	Nanjing, China	
Rayna Hoh Khai Ling	Silver	Gymnastics	Mixed multi-discipline team	2018	Buenos Aires, Argentina	

=== Demonstration sports ===
Malaysia gained three silver medals and four bronze medals from demonstration sports.

Medals won from demonstration sports
Name(s)	Medal	Sport	Event	Year	Location	Ref.
Ng Boon Bee Punch Gunalan	Silver	Badminton	Men's doubles	1972	Munich, Germany	
Hii King Hung	Bronze	Taekwondo	Bantamweight (47–51 kg)	1992	Barcelona, Spain	
Lim Yew Fai	Silver	Wushu	Men's Jianshu / Qiangshu	2008	Beijing, China	
Chai Fong Ying	Silver	Wushu	Women's Taijiquan / Taijijian	2008	Beijing, China	
Pui Fook Chien	Bronze	Wushu	Men's Nanquan / Nangun	2008	Beijing, China	
Chai Fong Wei	Bronze	Wushu	Women's Daoshu / Gunshu	2008	Beijing, China	
Diana Bong Siong Lin	Bronze	Wushu	Women's Nanquan / Nandao	2008	Beijing, China	

== Medal tally by sport ==
=== Summer Olympics ===
Medal tally by sport (Summer Olympics)
Sport	Gold	Silver	Bronze	Total
Badminton	0	7	5	12
Diving	0	1	1	2
Cycling	0	1	1	2
Total	0	9	8	16

=== Youth Summer Olympics ===
Medal tally by sport (Youth Summer Olympics)
Sport	Gold	Silver	Bronze	Total
Diving	0	3	1	4
Badminton	1	0	0	1
Field hockey	1	0	0	1
Total	2	3	1	6

==== Mixed-NOCs participation ====
Medal tally by sport
Sport	Gold	Silver	Bronze	Total
Badminton	1	0	0	1
Archery	0	1	0	1
Gymnastics	0	1	0	1
Total	1	1	1	3

== Medal tally by individual ==
Medal tally by individual
Person(s)	Gold	Silver	Bronze	Total
Lee Chong Wei	0	3	0	3
Pandelela Rinong	0	1	1	2
Azizulhasni Awang	0	1	1	2
Aaron Chia and Soh Wooi Yik	0	0	2	2
Cheah Soon Kit and Yap Kim Hock	0	1	0	1
Cheong Jun Hoong and Pandelela Rinong	0	1	0	1
Goh V Shem and Tan Wee Kiong	0	1	0	1
Chan Peng Soon and Goh Liu Ying	0	1	0	1
Razif Sidek and Jalani Sidek	0	0	1	1
Rashid Sidek	0	0	1	1
Lee Zii Jia	0	0	1	1
Total	0	9	7	16

=== Multiple medalists ===
According to official data of the International Olympic Committee, this is a list of people who have won two or more Olympic medals for Malaysia:

- ‡ – Still an active competitor

Multi-medalists
Athlete	Sport	Years	Games	Gender	1st place, gold medalist(s)	2nd place, silver medalist(s)	3rd place, bronze medalist(s)	Total
Lee Chong Wei	Badminton	2008–2016	Summer	Men	0	3	0	3
Pandelela Rinong ‡	Diving	2012–2016	Summer	Women	0	1	1	2
Azizulhasni Awang ‡	Cycling	2016–2020	Summer	Men	0	1	1	2
Aaron Chia ‡	Badminton	2020–2024	Summer	Men	0	0	2	2
Soh Wooi Yik ‡	Badminton	2020–2024	Summer	Men	0	0	2	2
