= Diving at the 2010 Summer Youth Olympics =

Diving at the I Summer Youth Olympic Games
- Pictogram used for Aquatics, with diving (left) and swimming (right) represented.
- Venue: Toa Payoh Swimming Complex
- Dates: 21 – 24 August 2010
- No. of events: 4 (2 boys, 2 girls)
- Competitors: 34 (17 boys, 17 girls) from 20 nations

Diving at the 2010 Summer Youth Olympics in Singapore was scheduled for the 21 till 24 of August, and consisted of the boy's and girl's 3 meter springboard and the boys' and girls' 10 meter platform. There were 48 competitors total.

Diving took place at the Toa Payoh Swimming Complex.

== Qualification Summary ==
The first nine ranked divers in each of the four events secured their qualification to participate in their respective diving events. However, each country may only have one male and one female diver representing the NOC.

Nation	Individual Diving					
Nation	Boys' 3m	Boys' 10m	Girls' 3m	Girls' 10m	Quota(s)	Athletes
Armenia	1				1	1
Australia			1	1	2	1
Brazil	1			1	2	2
Canada		1	1	1	3	2
China	1	1	1	1	4	2
Colombia	1				1	1
Cuba	1				1	1
France			1		1	1
Germany		1		1	2	2
Great Britain	1	1		1	3	2
Italy	1	1	1		3	2
Malaysia	1	1	1	1	4	2
Mexico	1	1	1	1	4	2
Monaco			1		1	1
North Korea		1		1	2	2
Russia	1	1	1	1	4	2
Singapore	1		1	1	3	3
Ukraine	1	1	1	1	4	2
United States	1	1	1	1	4	2
Venezuela	1	1			2	1
Total: 20 NOCs	11*	11*	11*	11*	48	32

=== Boys' 3m ===
Player	NOC
Gevorg Papoyan	Armenia
Pedro Abreu	Brazil
Marc Sabourin-Germain	Canada
Qiu Bo	China
Miguel Angel Reyes	Colombia
Abel Ramirez Tellez	Cuba
Thomas Daley	Great Britain
Tim Pyritz	Germany
Giovanni Tocci	Italy
Ooi Tze Liang	Malaysia
Ivan Garcia	Mexico
Timothy Lee Han Kuan	Singapore
Oleksandr Bondar	Ukraine
Michael Hixon	United States
Robert Paez	Venezuela

=== Boys' 10m ===
Player	NOC
Marc Sabourin-Germain	Canada
Qiu Bo	China
Thomas Daley	Great Britain
Tim Pyritz	Germany
Giovanni Tocci	Italy
Ooi Tze Liang	Malaysia
Ivan Garcia	Mexico
Il Myong Hyon	North Korea
Oleksandr Bondar	Ukraine
Michael Hixon	United States
Robert Paez	Venezuela

=== Girls' 3m ===
Player	NOC
Hannah Thek	Australia
Pamela Ware	Canada
Liu Jiao	China
Fanny Bouvet	France
Kieu Duong	Germany
Elena Bertocchi	Italy
Pandelela Rinong	Malaysia
Teresa Vallejo	Mexico
Pauline Ducruet	Monaco
Chloe Chan	Singapore
Viktoriya Potyekhina	Ukraine
Annika Lenz	United States
Beannelys Velasquez	Venezuela

=== Girls' 10m ===
Player	NOC
Hannah Thek	Australia
Nicoli Cruz	Brazil
Pamela Ware	Canada
Liu Jiao	China
Megan Sylvester	Great Britain
Kieu Duong	Germany
Pandelela Rinong	Malaysia
Teresa Vallejo	Mexico
Ji Hyang Sin	North Korea
Myra Jia Wen Lee	Singapore
Viktoriya Potyekhina	Ukraine
Annika Lenz	United States

== Competition schedule ==
Event date	Event day	Starting time	Event details
21 August	Saturday	13:30	Girls' 10m Platform Prelims
21 August	Saturday	20:30	Girls' 10m Platform Final
22 August	Sunday	13:30	Boys' 3m Springboard Prelims
22 August	Sunday	20:30	Boys' 3m Springboard Final
23 August	Monday	13:30	Girls' 3m Springboard Prelims
23 August	Monday	20:30	Girls' 3m Springboard Final
24 August	Tuesday	13:30	Boys' 10m Platform Prelims
24 August	Tuesday	20:30	Boys' 10m Platform Final

== Medal summary ==
=== Medal table ===
Rank	Nation	Gold	Silver	Bronze	Total
1	China	4	0	0	4
2	Ukraine	0	2	1	3
3	Malaysia	0	2	0	2
4	Mexico	0	0	1	1
4	North Korea	0	0	1	1
4	United States	0	0	1	1
Totals (6 entries)		4	4	4	12

=== Events ===
Event	Gold	Silver	Bronze
Boys' 3m springboard	Qiu Bo; China	Oleksandr Bondar; Ukraine	Michael Hixon; United States
Boys' 10m platform	Qiu Bo; China	Oleksandr Bondar; Ukraine	Ivan Garcia; Mexico
Girls' 3m springboard	Liu Jiao; China	Pandelela Rinong; Malaysia	Viktoriya Potyekhina; Ukraine
Girls' 10m platform	Liu Jiao; China	Pandelela Rinong; Malaysia	Sin Ji-hyang; North Korea
