= Swimming at the 2010 Summer Youth Olympics – Boys' 400 metre freestyle =

The boys' 400 metre freestyle event at the 2010 Youth Olympic Games took place on August 15, at the Singapore Sports School.

== Medalists ==
Gold	Dai Jun; China	3:50.91
Silver	Chad le Clos; South Africa	3:51.37
Bronze	Cristian Quintero; Venezuela	3:53.44

== Heats ==
=== Heat 1 ===
Rank	Lane	Name	Nationality	Time	Notes
1	2	Cristian Quintero	Venezuela	3:54.91	Q
2	4	Allan Gabriel Gutierrez Castro	Honduras	4:08.62	
3	5	Jorge Masson	Ecuador	4:08.80	
4	3	Henk Lowe	Guyana	5:09.04	

=== Heat 2 ===
Rank	Lane	Name	Nationality	Time	Notes
1	5	Chad Bobrosky	Canada	3:55.51	Q
2	6	Ganesh Pedurand	France	4:01.02	
3	7	Thomas Stephens	United States	4:02.11	
4	3	Stefan Sorak	Serbia	4:03.37	
5	2	Sebastian Arispe	Peru	4:06.82	
6	1	Amr Mohamed	Egypt	4:10.50	
7	4	Fedy Hannachi	Tunisia	4:11.70	
8	8	Anton Sveinn McKee	Iceland	4:12.80	

=== Heat 3 ===
Rank	Lane	Name	Nationality	Time	Notes
1	5	Jeremy Bagshaw	Canada	3:53.81	Q
2	4	Péter Bernek	Hungary	3:58.47	Q
3	6	Gustav Aberg Lejdstrom	Sweden	4:01.03	
4	3	Victor Rodrigues	Brazil	4:01.56	
5	2	Clement Lim	Singapore	4:04.24	
6	1	Kevin Kar Meng Lim	Malaysia	4:05.53	
7	8	Marko Blaževski	Macedonia	4:05.67	
8	7	Bertug Coskun	Turkey	4:05.76	

=== Heat 4 ===
Rank	Lane	Name	Nationality	Time	Notes
1	4	Jun Dai	China	3:56.63	Q
2	5	Balazs Zambo	Hungary	3:57.75	Q
3	3	Chad le Clos	South Africa	3:58.08	Q
4	2	Matt Stanley	New Zealand	3:58.45	Q
5	1	Justin James	Australia	4:03.46	
6	6	Gustavo Manuel Silva Santa	Portugal	4:07.01	
7	8	Yaraslau Pronin	Belarus	4:07.90	
8	7	Pavol Jelenak	Slovakia	4:09.98	

== Final ==
Rank	Lane	Name	Nationality	Time	Notes
1st place, gold medalist(s)	6	Jun Dai	China	3:50.91	
2nd place, silver medalist(s)	7	Chad le Clos	South Africa	3:51.37	
3rd place, bronze medalist(s)	5	Cristian Quintero	Venezuela	3:53.44	
4	3	Chad Bobrosky	Canada	3:54.43	
5	4	Jeremy Bagshaw	Canada	3:55.81	
6	2	Balazs Zambo	Hungary	3:56.56	
7	1	Matt Stanley	New Zealand	3:56.75	
8	8	Péter Bernek	Hungary	3:56.77	
