= Gymnastics at the 2010 Summer Youth Olympics – Women's trampoline =

Women's trampoline competition at the 2010 Summer Youth Olympics was held on 20 August at the Bishan Sports Hall. The competition consisted of two rounds. In the first round, each trampolinist performed two routines on the trampoline. One routine had to include required elements, while the other was a voluntary routine. Scores were given for both execution and difficulty in each routine, summed to give a routine score. The two routine scores in the first round determined qualification for the second; the eight top finishers moved on to the final. The final consisted entirely of a single voluntary routine, with no preliminary scores being carried over.

== Medalists ==
Gold	Silver	Bronze
Dong Yu; China	Sviatlana Makshtarova; Belarus	Chisato Doihata; Japan

== Qualification ==
Rank	Name	Routine 1	Routine 2	Total
1	Dong Yu (CHN)	28.800	39.600	68.400
2	Savannah Vinsant (USA)	27.200	37.400	64.600
3	Sviatlana Makshtarova (BLR)	27.500	37.100	64.600
4	Chisato Doihata (JPN)	26.600	35.800	62.400
5	Mariah Madigan (CAN)	27.100	34.400	61.500
6	Daienne Lima (BRA)	23.800	34.800	58.600
7	Madeleine Johnson (AUS)	26.100	32.300	58.400
8	Simone Scherer (SUI)	25.700	32.300	58.000
9	Diana Klyuchnyk (UKR)	22.900	34.100	57.000
10	Denise Liefting (NED)	25.800	29.900	55.700
11	Iolanthea Louw (RSA)	21.900	18.800	40.700
12	Leonie Adam (GER)	26.400	10.800	37.200

== Final ==
Rank	Name	Difficulty	Execution	Penalty	Total
Gold medal	Dong Yu (CHN)	13.500	26.400		39.900
Silver medal	Sviatlana Makshtarova (BLR)	13.100	24.600		37.700
Bronze medal	Chisato Doihata (JPN)	11.300	25.400		36.700
4	Mariah Madigan (CAN)	13.300	22.300		35.600
5	Savannah Vinsant (USA)	12.100	21.400		33.500
6	Madeleine Johnson (AUS)	12.700	20.700		33.400
7	Simone Scherer (SUI)	10.600	20.600		31.200
8	Daienne Lima (BRA)	10.000	16.400		26.400
