= Dong Yu =

Dong Yu may refer to:

- Dong Yu (gymnast), Chinese gymnast
- Dong Yu (footballer) (born 1994), Chinese footballer

== See also ==
- Yu Dong (born 1971), Chinese businessman and film producer
