= Norway at the 2010 Summer Youth Olympics =

- IOC code: NOR
- NOC: Norwegian Olympic Committee
- Website: www.idrett.no

in Singapore
- Competitors: 5 in 4 sports
- Flag bearer: Harald Faeste
- Medals Ranked 84th: Gold 0 Silver 0 Bronze 1 Total 1

Summer Youth Olympics appearances
- 2010; 2014; 2018; 2026

Norway participated at the 2010 Youth Olympic Games in Singapore.

The Norwegian squad consisted of 5 athletes competing in 4 sports: aquatics (swimming), sailing, shooting and wrestling.

== Medalists ==
Medal	Name	Sport	Event	Date
Bronze	Lavrans Solli	Swimming	Boys' 100m Backstroke	16 Aug

== Sailing ==
One Person Dinghy

Athlete	Event	Race												Points	Rank
Athlete	Event	1	2	3	4	5	6	7	8	9	10	11	M*	Points	Rank
Harald Faeste	Boys' Byte CII	6	15	6	4	13	5	13	18	~~19~~	~~19~~	13	10	103	11

== Shooting ==
Rifle

Athlete	Event	Qualification		Final		
Athlete	Event	Score	Rank	Score	Total	Rank
Malin Westerheim	Girls' 10m Air Rifle	390	11	Did not advance		

== Swimming ==
Athletes	Event	Heat		Semifinal		Final	
Athletes	Event	Time	Position	Time	Position	Time	Position
Lavrans Solli	Boys’ 100m Backstroke	57.08	2 Q	56.39	3 Q	55.20	Bronze medal
Lavrans Solli	Boys’ 200m Backstroke	2:04.87	6 Q			2:04.75	6

== Wrestling ==
Freestyle

Athlete	Event	Pools		Final	Rank
Athlete	Event	Groups	Rank	Final	Rank
Karoline Loevik	Girls' 52kg	Yuan (CHN); L 0–2 (0–6, 0–2)	4	7th Place Match; Eustaquio (GUM); W T. Fall (7–0, 6–0)	7
Karoline Loevik	Girls' 52kg	Nguyen (VIE); L Fall (3–2)	4	7th Place Match; Eustaquio (GUM); W T. Fall (7–0, 6–0)	7
Karoline Loevik	Girls' 52kg	Canon (COL); L 0–2 (2–3, 1–3)	4	7th Place Match; Eustaquio (GUM); W T. Fall (7–0, 6–0)	7

Greco-Roman

Athlete	Event	Pools		Final	Rank
Athlete	Event	Groups	Rank	Final	Rank
Paal Eirik Gundersen	Boys' 50kg	Sulaimonov (KGZ); L T. Fall (0–7, 0–6)	4	7th Place Match; BYE	7
Paal Eirik Gundersen	Boys' 50kg	Boughazi (ALG); L 0–2 (1–5, 3–4)	4	7th Place Match; BYE	7
Paal Eirik Gundersen	Boys' 50kg	Khaqqilov (UZB); L 0–2 (0–6, 0–6)	4	7th Place Match; BYE	7
