= Liu Jiao =

Liu Jiao may refer to:

- Liu Jiao (prince) (died 178 BC), Prince of Chu during the Chinese Han Dynasty
- Liu Jiao (diver), Chinese female diver
