= Diving at the 2010 Summer Youth Olympics – Girls' 10m platform =

The Girls' 10m platform at diving at the 2010 Summer Youth Olympics was held on August 21 at 20:30. 12 competitors featured in this event. Earlier that day there were the preliminaries to determine the finalists (13:30 local time).

== Medalists ==
Gold	Liu Jiao; China	479.60
Silver	Pandelela Rinong; Malaysia	454.35
Bronze	Sin Ji Hyang; North Korea	430.20

== Results ==
Rank	Diver	Preliminary		Final	
Rank	Diver	Points	Rank	Points	Rank
1st place, gold medalist(s)	Liu Jiao (CHN)	491.45	1	479.60	1
2nd place, silver medalist(s)	Pandelela Rinong (MAS)	413.30	2	454.35	2
3rd place, bronze medalist(s)	Sin Ji Hyang (PRK)	386.20	5	430.20	3
4	Annika Lenz (USA)	407.00	3	429.50	4
5	Kieu Duong (GER)	347.65	10	388.95	5
6	Viktoriya Potyekhina (UKR)	383.20	6	385.95	6
7	Hannah Thek (AUS)	390.80	4	375.75	7
8	Pamela Ware (CAN)	357.90	9	373.05	8
9	Teresa Vallejo (MEX)	361.20	8	355.10	9
10	Megan Sylvester (GBR)	377.10	7	351.60	10
11	Nicoli Cruz (BRA)	313.85	11	322.10	11
12	Myra Lee Jia Wen (SIN)	280.25	12	273.95	12
