= Malaysia at the 2026 Summer Youth Olympics =

- Flag of Malaysia
- IOC code: MAS
- NOC: Olympic Council of Malaysia
- Website: www.olympic.org.my

in Dakar, Senegal October 31, 2026 – November 13, 2026
- Competitors: 12 in 9 sports
- Flag bearers: Shannon Tan Yan Qing & Kai Shen Lim
- Medals: Gold 0 Silver 0 Bronze 0 Total 0

Summer Youth Olympics appearances (overview)
- 2010; 2014; 2018; 2026

Malaysia is scheduled to compete at the 2026 Summer Youth Olympics in Dakar, Senegal from October 31 to November 13, 2026. This will mark Malaysia's fourth appearance at the Youth Olympics, after making its debut in 2010.

Swimmer Shannon Tan Yan Qing and wushu taolu athlete Kai Shen Lim served as the flag bearers for the opening ceremony.

Malaysia failed to win any medals at this Games for the first time in history, marking its worst performance since first participation in 2010, although three podium misses took place in three events: Athletics, Swimming and Wushu.

== Competitors ==
The following is the list of number of competitors participating at the Games per sport/discipline.

Sport	Men	Women	Total
Athletics	2	0	2
Badminton	1	0	1
Beach volleyball	0	2	2
Breaking	0	1	1
Fencing	0	1	1
Skateboarding	1	0	1
Sailing	0	1	1
Swimming	1	1	2
Wushu	1	0	1
Total	6	6	12

== Athletics ==
Malaysia entered two male athletes.

=== Track & road events ===
Men

Athlete	Event	Heat		Semifinal		Final	
Athlete	Event	Result	Rank	Result	Rank	Result	Rank
Zacharry Lawrence	400 m hurdles						

=== Field events ===
Men

Athlete	Event	Qualification		Final	
Athlete	Event	Distance	Position	Distance	Position
Gerfan Frank	Pole vault				

== Badminton ==
Malaysia entered one male athlete.

Athlete	Event	Round of 16	Quarterfinals	Semifinals	Final / BM	
Athlete	Event	Opposition Result	Opposition Result	Opposition Result	Opposition Result	Rank
Lucas Lee	Men's singles					

== Beach volleyball ==
Malaysia received a quota place for the women's tournament.

Summary

Team	Event	Group stage				Round of 16	Quarterfinals	Semifinals	Final / PG / BM	
Team	Event	Opposition Result	Opposition Result	Opposition Result	Rank	Opposition Result	Opposition Result	Opposition Result	Opposition Result	Rank
Yu Heng Goh; Jing Yi Ong	Women's tournament									

== Breaking ==
Malaysia entered one female athlete.

Athlete	Nickname	Event	Group Stage			Quarterfinal	Semifinal	Final / BM	
Athlete	Nickname	Event	Round	Votes	Rank	Opposition Result	Opposition Result	Opposition Result	Rank
	Reese	B-Girls							

== Fencing ==
Malaysia entered one female athlete.

Athlete	Event	Round of 64	Round of 32	Round of 16	Quarterfinal	Semifinal	Final / BM	
Athlete	Event	Opposition Score	Opposition Score	Opposition Score	Opposition Score	Opposition Score	Opposition Score	Rank
Nur Qalesha Mohd Radzuan	Women's foil							

== Skateboarding ==
Malaysia entered one male athlete based on available quotas.

Athlete	Event	Semifinal		Final	
Athlete	Event	Result	Rank	Result	Rank
Mahathir Muhammad Nor Azam	Men's street				

== Sailing ==
Malaysia entered one female athlete.

Athlete	Event	Opening Series – Points per Race											Total points	Net points	Final rank
Athlete	Event	1	2	3	4	5	6	7	8	9	10	M	Total points	Net points	Final rank
Angie Tan	Women's windsurfing														

== Swimming ==
Malaysia entered two swimmers, one male and one female.

Athlete	Event	Heat		Semifinal		Final	
Athlete	Event	Time	Rank	Time	Rank	Time	Rank
Cheng Feng Loo	50 m freestyle						
Cheng Feng Loo	100 m freestyle						
Cheng Feng Loo	200 m freestyle						
Shannon Tan Yan Qing	100 m freestyle						
Shannon Tan Yan Qing	100 m butterfly						
Shannon Tan Yan Qing	200 m butterfly						
Shannon Tan Yan Qing	200 m individual medley						

== Wushu ==
Malaysia entered one male athlete after quotas were assigned by the International Wushu Federation.

Athlete	Event	Taijishan routine		Taijiquan routine		Total Points	Final Rank
Athlete	Event	Points	Rank	Points	Rank	Total Points	Final Rank
Kai Shen Lim	Men's taijiquan combined						
