= Breaking at the 2026 Summer Youth Olympics =

Breaking at the IV Summer Youth Olympic Games
- Venue: Tour de l'Oeuf Complex
- Dates: 12 & 13 November
- No. of events: 2
- Competitors: 24 from 22 nations

Breaking at the 2026 Summer Youth Olympics was be held on 12 and 13 November. The event will take place at the Tour de l'Oeuf Complex in Dakar, Senegal.

== Qualification ==
The following quota places are available per gender:

- 1× Host (Senegal)
- 4 per continental region (Africa, Asia, Americas, Europe)
- 7 via the World Ranking

In May 2026, the World DanceSport Federation (WDSF) announced the exact allocation of quota places:

B-Boys	B-Girls
Senegal
Belarus	Bulgaria
China	France
Chinese Taipei	Germany
Colombia	Japan
Denmark	Kazakhstan
Hong Kong	Malaysia
Italy	Morocco
Morocco	South Korea
Latvia	Spain
Netherlands	Ukraine
Poland	United States

== Competition format ==
First a seeding round will take place to determine the seeding of the athletes. Then the athletes will be allocated into 3 groups with 4 athletes each. The two best from each group as well as the two best third placed athletes move on to the quarter finals.

== Medal summary ==
=== Medal table ===
* Host nation (Senegal)

Rank	Nation	Gold	Silver	Bronze	Total
1	China	1	0	0	1
1	Japan	1	0	0	1
3	Chinese Taipei	0	1	0	1
3	Ukraine	0	1	0	1
5	Belarus	0	0	1	1
5	Spain	0	0	1	1
Totals (6 entries)		2	2	2	6

=== Medalists ===
Event	Gold	Silver	Bronze
B-Boys	Cui Shengyu; Holy Rain; China	Lin Yong-yue; Saturn; Chinese Taipei	Heorhi Salavei; Gera; Belarus
B-Girls	Hiyo Yamada; Hiyo; Japan	Nikol Dzhuryk; Nikastar; Ukraine	Alicia Babarro; Mini Ali; Spain
