= Tuvalu at the 2010 Summer Youth Olympics =

- IOC code: TUV
- NOC: Tuvalu Olympic Committee

in Singapore
- Competitors: 2 in 2 sports
- Flag bearer: Maima Moiya
- Medals: Gold 0 Silver 0 Bronze 0 Total 0

Summer Youth Olympics appearances
- 2010; 2014; 2018

Tuvalu participated in the 2010 Summer Youth Olympics in Singapore.

== Athletics ==
Note: The athletes who do not have a "Q" next to their Qualification Rank advance to a non-medal ranking final.

=== Boys ===
Track and Road Events

Athletes	Event	Qualification		Final	
Athletes	Event	Result	Rank	Result	Rank
Maima Moiya	Boys’ 400m	1:03.28	26 qD	DNS	

== Badminton ==
Girls

Athlete	Event	Group Stage				Knock-Out Stage			
Athlete	Event	Match 1	Match 2	Match 3	Rank	Quarterfinal	Semifinal	Final	Rank
Tiaese Tapumanaia	Girls' Singles	Taerattanachai (THA) L 0-2 (1-21, 0-21)	Chiang (TPE) L 0-2 (1-21, 4-21)	Handunkuttihettige (SRI) L 0-2 (1-21, 7-21)	4	Did not advance			
