= Badminton at the 2010 Summer Youth Olympics – Girls' singles =

Girls' singles at the I Summer Youth Olympic Games
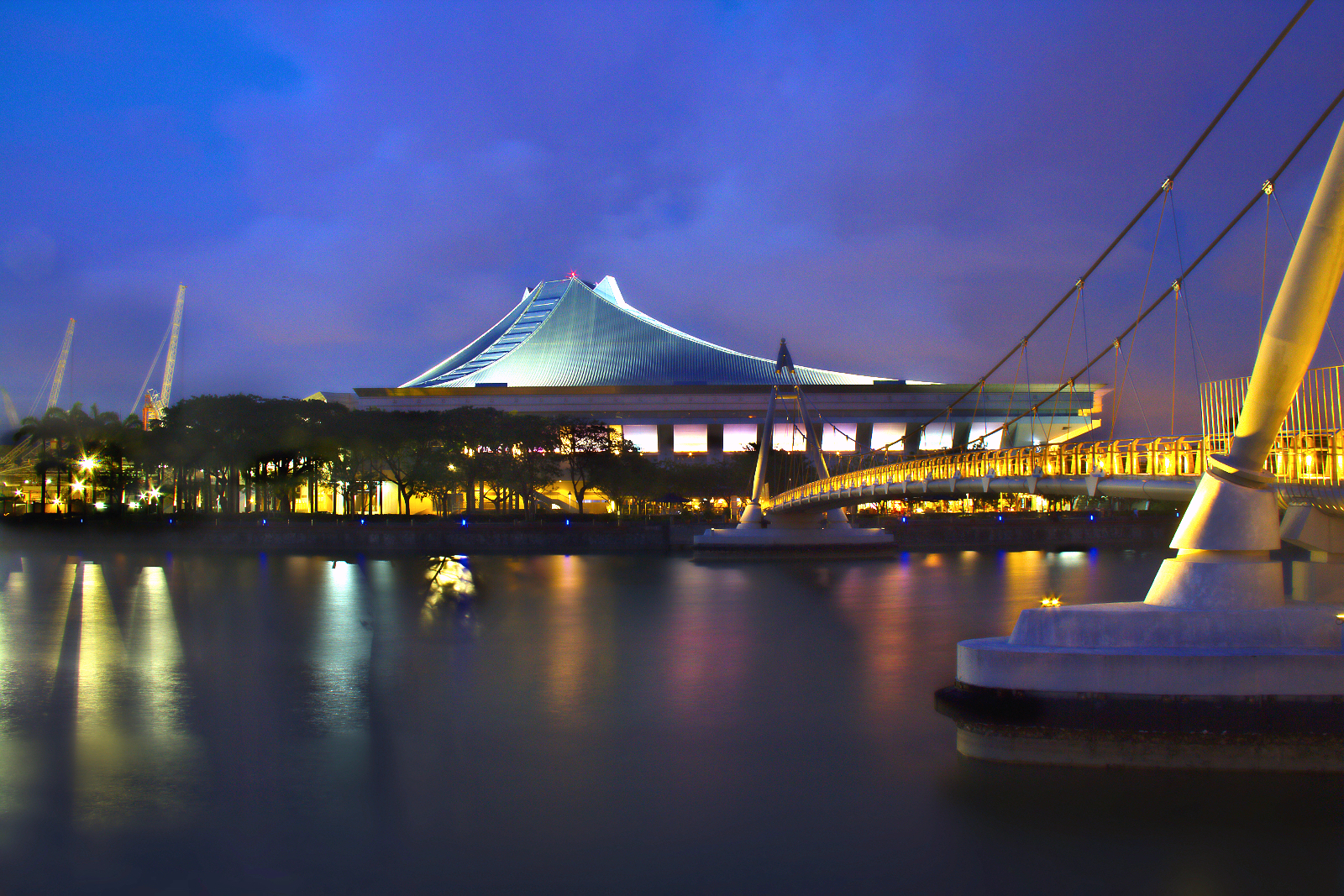
- Exterior view of the Singapore Indoor Stadium, where the girls' singles badminton tournament was held.
- Venue: Singapore Indoor Stadium
- Dates: 15 – 19 August 2010
- Competitors: 32 from 31 nations

Medalists
| 1st place, gold medalist(s) | | Sapsiree Taerattanachai | Thailand |
| 2nd place, silver medalist(s) | | Deng Xuan | China |
| 3rd place, bronze medalist(s) | | Vũ Thị Trang | Vietnam |

These are the results of the girls' singles badminton event at the 2010 Summer Youth Olympics. The 32 qualified athletes were split into 8 groups, with four players each. In their groups, they play a one-way round-robin and the first of each group qualifies to the quarterfinals, where they play a knock-out stage until the medal matches.

Badminton was staged at the Singapore Indoor Stadium.

== Medalists ==
| Gold | Sapsiree Taerattanachai; Thailand |
| Silver | Deng Xuan; China |
| Bronze | Vũ Thị Trang; Vietnam |

== Group play ==
=== Results ===
Key to colours in group tables
| Player advancing to knockout stage |

==== Group A ====
| Athlete | Matches | | | Sets | | | Points | | |
| Athlete | W | L | Tot | W | L | Diff | W | L | Diff |
|---|---|---|---|---|---|---|---|---|---|
| Josephine Wentholt (NED) | 3 | 0 | 3 | 6 | 1 | +5 | 131 | 99 | +32 |
| Misaki Matsutomo (JPN) | 2 | 1 | 3 | 5 | 2 | +3 | 141 | 73 | +68 |
| Tracy Wong (CAN) | 1 | 2 | 3 | 2 | 4 | -2 | 85 | 120 | –35 |
| Kate Foo Kune (MRI) | 0 | 3 | 3 | 0 | 6 | –6 | 61 | 126 | –65 |

Sunday, 15 August
09:00
| Misaki Matsutomo (JPN) | 1-2 | Josephine Wentholt (NED) | 17-21, 21–5, 19-21 | 42min | Court 1 |
10:40
| Tracy Wong (CAN) | 2-0 | Kate Foo Kune (MRI) | 21–17, 21–19 | 24min | Court 3 |
19:20
| Misaki Matsutomo (JPN) | 2-0 | Kate Foo Kune (MRI) | 21–4, 21–2 | 15min | Court 2 |
20:10
| Tracy Wong (CAN) | 0-2 | Josephine Wentholt (NED) | 15–21, 8–21 | 16min | Court 3 |
Monday, 16 August
13:30
| Misaki Matsutomo (JPN) | 2-0 | Tracy Wong (CAN) | 21-11, 21-9 | 23min | Court 2 |
15:10
| Kate Foo Kune (MRI) | 0-2 | Josephine Wentholt (NED) | 7-21, 12-21 | 17min | Court 3 |

==== Group B ====
| Athlete | Matches | | | Sets | | | Points | | |
| Athlete | W | L | Tot | W | L | Diff | W | L | Diff |
|---|---|---|---|---|---|---|---|---|---|
| Sarah Milne (GBR) | 3 | 0 | 3 | 6 | 0 | +6 | 126 | 88 | +38 |
| Cee Nantana Ketpura (USA) | 2 | 1 | 3 | 4 | 2 | +2 | 122 | 87 | +35 |
| Léa Palermo (FRA) | 1 | 2 | 3 | 2 | 4 | –2 | 97 | 115 | –18 |
| Alexandra Mathis (AUT) | 0 | 3 | 3 | 0 | 6 | –6 | 71 | 126 | –55 |

Sunday, 15 August
09:30
| Sarah Milne (GBR) | 2-0 | Léa Palermo (FRA) | 21-11, 21–18 | 25min | Court 3 |
10:10
| Alexandra Mathis (AUT) | 0-2 | Cee Nantana Ketpura (USA) | 10-21, 9-21 | 18min | Court 3 |
19:00
| Alexandra Mathis (AUT) | 0-2 | Léa Palermo (FRA) | 19-21, 12-21 | 25min | Court 3 |
20:30
| Sarah Milne (GBR) | 2-0 | Cee Nantana Ketpura (USA) | 21-19, 21-19 | 40min | Court 2 |
Monday, 16 August
14:00
| Sarah Milne (GBR) | 2-0 | Alexandra Mathis (AUT) | 21-11, 21-10 | 26min | Court 3 |
14:15
| Cee Nantana Ketpura (USA) | 2-0 | Léa Palermo (FRA) | 21-13, 21-13 | 24min | Court 2 |

==== Group C ====
| Athlete | Matches | | | Sets | | | Points | | |
| Athlete | W | L | Tot | W | L | Diff | W | L | Diff |
|---|---|---|---|---|---|---|---|---|---|
| Carolina Marín (ESP) | 3 | 0 | 3 | 6 | 0 | +6 | 126 | 51 | +75 |
| Airi Mikkelä (FIN) | 2 | 1 | 3 | 4 | 2 | +2 | 103 | 91 | +12 |
| Tara Pilven (AUS) | 1 | 2 | 3 | 2 | 4 | -2 | 93 | 94 | –1 |
| Dragana Volkanovska (MKD) | 0 | 3 | 3 | 0 | 6 | –6 | 40 | 126 | –86 |

Sunday, 15 August
9:35
| Carolina Marín (ESP) | 2-0 | Tara Pilven (AUS) | 21–8, 21–9 | 20min | Court 1 |
11:20
| Dragana Volkanovska (MKD) | 0-2 | Airi Mikkelä (FIN) | 10-21, 5-21 | 15min | Court 1 |
18:30
| Carolina Marín (ESP) | 2-0 | Airi Mikkelä (FIN) | 21–8, 21–11 | 23min | Court 1 |
20:50
| Dragana Volkanovska (MKD) | 0-2 | Tara Pilven (AUS) | 7–21, 3–21 | 18min | Court 1 |
Monday, 16 August
13:45
| Carolina Marín (ESP) | 2-0 | Dragana Volkanovska (MKD) | 21-5, 21-10 | 12min | Court 2 |
15:50
| Airi Mikkelä (FIN) | 2-0 | Tara Pilven (AUS) | 21-18, 21-16 | 29min | Court 1 |

==== Group D ====
| Athlete | Matches | | | Sets | | | Points | | |
| Athlete | W | L | Tot | W | L | Diff | W | L | Diff |
|---|---|---|---|---|---|---|---|---|---|
| Deng Xuan (CHN) | 3 | 0 | 3 | 6 | 0 | +6 | 127 | 62 | +65 |
| Renna Suwarno (INA) | 2 | 1 | 3 | 4 | 2 | +2 | 115 | 84 | +31 |
| Katherine Winder (PER) | 1 | 2 | 3 | 2 | 5 | -3 | 99 | 131 | -32 |
| Victoria Cheng (NZL) | 0 | 3 | 3 | 1 | 6 | –5 | 81 | 145 | –64 |

Sunday, 15 August
10:25
| Deng Xuan (CHN) | 2-0 | Katherine Winder (PER) | 21–12, 21–5 | 20min | Court 2 |
11:35
| Renna Suwarno (INA) | 2-0 | Victoria Cheng (NZL) | 21-15, 21-5 | 18min | Court 2 |
21:05
| Deng Xuan (CHN) | 2-0 | Victoria Cheng (NZL) | 21-9, 21-5 | 20min | Court 2 |
21:20
| Renna Suwarno (INA) | 2-0 | Katherine Winder (PER) | 21–9, 21–12 | 25min | Court 3 |
Monday, 16 August
14:30
| Deng Xuan (CHN) | 2-0 | Renna Suwarno (INA) | 21-11, 22-20 | 32min | Court 2 |
16:20
| Victoria Cheng (NZL) | 1-2 | Katherine Winder (PER) | 16-21, 21-19, 10-21 | 47min | Court 3 |

==== Group E ====
| Athlete | Matches | | | Sets | | | Points | | |
| Athlete | W | L | Tot | W | L | Diff | W | L | Diff |
|---|---|---|---|---|---|---|---|---|---|
| Sapsiree Taerattanachai (THA) | 3 | 0 | 3 | 6 | 0 | +6 | 126 | 43 | +83 |
| Chiang Mei-hui (TPE) | 2 | 1 | 3 | 4 | 2 | +2 | 104 | 75 | +29 |
| Lekha Shehani (SRI) | 1 | 2 | 3 | 2 | 4 | –2 | 92 | 92 | 0 |
| Tiaese Tapumanaia (TUV) | 0 | 3 | 3 | 0 | 6 | –6 | 14 | 126 | –112 |

Sunday, 15 August
13:30
| Sapsiree Taerattanachai (THA) | 2-0 | Tiaese Tapumanaia (TUV) | 21–1, 21–0 | 12min | Court 1 |
15:10
| Chiang Mei-hui (TPE) | 2-0 | Lekha Shehani (SRI) | 22-9, 21-19 | 25min | Court 3 |
Monday, 16 August
9:30
| Sapsiree Taerattanachai (THA) | 2-0 | Lekha Shehani (SRI) | 21-13, 21-9 | 27min | Court 2 |
10:40
| Chiang Mei-hui (TPE) | 2-0 | Tiaese Tapumanaia (TUV) | 21-1, 21-4 | 12min | Court 3 |
18:30
| Sapsiree Taerattanachai (THA) | 2-0 | Chiang Mei-hui (TPE) | 21-13, 21-7 | 27min | Court 1 |
20:10
| Lekha Shehani (SRI) | 2-0 | Tiaese Tapumanaia (TUV) | 21-1, 21-7 | 13min | Court 3 |

==== Group F ====
| Athlete | Matches | | | Sets | | | Points | | |
| Athlete | W | L | Tot | W | L | Diff | W | L | Diff |
|---|---|---|---|---|---|---|---|---|---|
| Soniia Cheah Su Ya (MAS) | 3 | 0 | 3 | 6 | 0 | +6 | 126 | 56 | +70 |
| Ebru Tunalı (TUR) | 2 | 1 | 3 | 4 | 2 | +2 | 100 | 99 | +1 |
| Mariana Ugalde (MEX) | 1 | 2 | 3 | 2 | 4 | -2 | 94 | 117 | -23 |
| Fatima Azeez (NGR) | 0 | 3 | 3 | 0 | 6 | –6 | 78 | 126 | –48 |

Sunday, 15 August
15:15
| Ebru Tunalı (TUR) | 2-0 | Fatima Azeez (NGR) | 21–9, 21–19 | 25min | Court 1 |
16:05
| Soniia Cheah Su Ya (MAS) | 2-0 | Mariana Ugalde (MEX) | 21-14, 21-9 | 40min | Court 2 |
Monday, 16 August
9:30
| Soniia Cheah Su Ya (MAS) | 2-0 | Fatima Azeez (NGR) | 21-7, 21-10 | 20min | Court 3 |
10:05
| Ebru Tunalı (TUR) | 2-0 | Mariana Ugalde (MEX) | 21-11, 21-18 | 26min | Court 3 |
19:00
| Soniia Cheah Su Ya (MAS) | 2-0 | Ebru Tunalı (TUR) | 21-7, 21-9 | 23min | Court 3 |
19:35
| Fatima Azeez (NGR) | 0-2 | Mariana Ugalde (MEX) | 19-21, 14-21 | 25min | Court 3 |

==== Group G ====
| Athlete | Matches | | | Sets | | | Points | | |
| Athlete | W | L | Tot | W | L | Diff | W | L | Diff |
|---|---|---|---|---|---|---|---|---|---|
| Lene Clausen (DEN) | 3 | 0 | 3 | 6 | 1 | +5 | 146 | 68 | +78 |
| Fabienne Deprez (GER) | 2 | 1 | 3 | 5 | 2 | +3 | 133 | 100 | +33 |
| Bridget Shamim Bangi (UGA) | 1 | 2 | 3 | 2 | 5 | -3 | 102 | 125 | –23 |
| Aishath Afnaan Rasheed (MDV) | 0 | 3 | 3 | 1 | 6 | –5 | 57 | 145 | –88 |

Sunday, 15 August
14:35
| Fabienne Deprez (GER) | 2-0 | Bridget Shamim Bangi (UGA) | 21–10, 21–16 | 21min | Court 3 |
15:50
| Lene Clausen (DEN) | 2-0 | Aishath Afnaan Rasheed (MDV) | 21-2, 21-2 | 16min | Court 1 |
Monday, 16 August
09:35
| Fabienne Deprez (GER) | 2-0 | Aishath Afnaan Rasheed (MDV) | 21-5, 21-7 | 17min | Court 1 |
11:20
| Lene Clausen (DEN) | 2-0 | Bridget Shamim Bangi (UGA) | 21-8, 21-7 | 15min | Court 1 |
18:45
| Fabienne Deprez (GER) | 1-2 | Lene Clausen (DEN) | 22-20, 18-21, 9-21 | 43min | Court 2 |
20:50
| Aishath Afnaan Rasheed (MDV) | 1-2 | Bridget Shamim Bangi (UGA) | 21-19, 8-21, 12-21 | 33min | Court 1 |

==== Group H ====
| Athlete | Matches | | | Sets | | | Points | | |
| Athlete | W | L | Tot | W | L | Diff | W | L | Diff |
|---|---|---|---|---|---|---|---|---|---|
| Vũ Thị Trang (VIE) | 3 | 0 | 3 | 6 | 2 | +4 | 155 | 27 | +28 |
| Choi Hye-in (KOR) | 2 | 1 | 3 | 5 | 2 | +3 | 135 | 101 | +34 |
| Naoko Fukuman (JPN) | 1 | 2 | 3 | 3 | 4 | -1 | 117 | 116 | +1 |
| Yelyzaveta Zharka (UKR) | 0 | 3 | 3 | 0 | 6 | –6 | 63 | 126 | –63 |

Sunday, 15 August
14:20
| Vũ Thị Trang (VIE) | 2-1 | Choi Hye-in (KOR) | 13–21, 21–18, 21-12 | 50min | Court 2 |
14:40
| Naoko Fukuman (JPN) | 2-0 | Yelyzaveta Zharka (UKR) | 21–8, 21–8 | 22min | Court 1 |
Monday, 16 August
10:00
| Naoko Fukuman (JPN) | 0-2 | Choi Hye-in (KOR) | 15-21, 14-21 | 35min | Court 2 |
11:50
| Vũ Thị Trang (VIE) | 2-0 | Yelyzaveta Zharka (UKR) | 21-16, 21-14 | 30min | Court 3 |
19:30
| Choi Hye-in (KOR) | 2-0 | Yelyzaveta Zharka (UKR) | 21-6, 21-11 | 20min | Court 2 |
19:40
| Naoko Fukuman (JPN) | 1-2 | Vũ Thị Trang (VIE) | 15-21, 21-16, 10-21 | 47min | Court 1 |

== Knockout stage ==
Quarterfinals; Tuesday, 17 August
Josephine Wentholt (NED) | 15 | 8
Sarah Milne (GBR) | 21 | 21
Carolina Marín (ESP) | 12 | 19
Deng Xuan (CHN) | 21 | 21
Sapsiree Taerattanachai (THA) | 21 | 21
Soniia Cheah Su Ya (MAS) | 15 | 16
Lene Clausen (DEN) | 19 | 13
Vũ Thị Trang (VIE) | 21 | 21

Semifinals; Wednesday, 18 August
Sarah Milne (GBR) | 12 | 12
Deng Xuan (CHN) | 21 | 21
Sapsiree Taerattanachai (THA) | 21 | 21
Vũ Thị Trang (VIE) | 18 | 8

Final; Thursday, 19 August
Deng Xuan (CHN) | 14 | 17
Sapsiree Taerattanachai (THA) | 21 | 21

| Bronze Medal Match; Thursday, 19 August |
| Sarah Milne (GBR) | 15 | 20 |
| Vũ Thị Trang (VIE) | 21 | 22 |
