= Skateboarding at the 2026 Summer Youth Olympics =

Skateboarding at the IV Summer Youth Olympic Games
- Venue: Tour de l'Oeuf Complex Skatepark
- Dates: 4–5 November
- No. of events: 2
- Competitors: 24 from 24 nations

Skateboarding at the 2026 Summer Youth Olympics was held from 4 to 5 November. The events took place at the Tour de l'Oeuf Complex Skatepark in Dakar, Senegal.

== Qualification ==
There were 24 quota places available in total, 12 per gender.

| Region | NOC | Men | Women |
|---|---|---|---|
| Africa | Morocco | No | Yes |
| Africa | South Africa | Yes | No |
| Americas | Argentina | Yes | No |
| Americas | Brazil | No | Yes |
| Americas | Canada | No | Yes |
| Americas | Chile | No | Yes |
| Americas | Colombia | Yes | No |
| Americas | Mexico | No | Yes |
| Americas | Peru | Yes | No |
| Americas | Puerto Rico | No | Yes |
| Americas | United States | Yes | No |
| Asia | China | No | Yes |
| Asia | Chinese Taipei | Yes | No |
| Asia | Indonesia | Yes | No |
| Asia | Malaysia | Yes | No |
| Europe | Bulgaria | No | Yes |
| Europe | Czech Republic | No | Yes |
| Europe | France | No | Yes |
| Europe | Italy | Yes | No |
| Europe | Netherlands | Yes | No |
| Europe | Norway | Yes | No |
| Europe | Russia | No | Yes |
| Europe | Switzerland | Yes | No |
| Oceania | Australia | No | Yes |

== Medal summary ==
=== Medal table ===
* Host nation (Senegal)

| Rank | Nation | Gold | Silver | Bronze | Total |
|---|---|---|---|---|---|
| 1 | China | 1 | 0 | 0 | 1 |
| 1 | United States | 1 | 0 | 0 | 1 |
| 3 | Brazil | 0 | 1 | 0 | 1 |
| 3 | Netherlands | 0 | 1 | 0 | 1 |
| 5 | Canada | 0 | 0 | 1 | 1 |
| 5 | Switzerland | 0 | 0 | 1 | 1 |
| Totals (6 entries) | | 2 | 2 | 2 | 6 |

=== Medalists ===
| Event | Gold | Silver | Bronze |
|---|---|---|---|
| Men's street | Julian Jeang-Agliardi; United States | Tijmen Overbeek; Netherlands | Simon Gerber; Switzerland |
| Women's street | Zhu Yuanling; China | Duda Ribeiro; Brazil | Evie Pritchard; Canada |
