= Norway at the 2026 Summer Youth Olympics =

- Flag of Norway
- IOC code: NOR
- NOC: Norwegian Olympic and Paralympic Committee and Confederation of Sports
- Website: www.idrettsforbundet.no

in Dakar, Senegal October 31, 2026 – November 13, 2026
- Competitors: 6 in 5 sports
- Medals: Gold 0 Silver 0 Bronze 0 Total 0

Summer Youth Olympics appearances
- 2010; 2014; 2018; 2026

Norway is scheduled to compete at the 2026 Summer Youth Olympics in Dakar, Senegal from October 31 to November 13, 2026. This will mark Norway's fourth appearance at the Youth Olympics, after making its debut in 2010.

== Competitors ==
The following is the list of number of competitors participating at the Games per sport/discipline.

Sport	Men	Women	Total
Beach volleyball	2	0	2
Road cycling	0	1	1
Skateboarding	1	0	1
Taekwondo	0	1	1
Triathlon	1	0	1
Total	4	2	6

== Beach volleyball ==
Norway received a quota place for the boys' tournament.

Athletes	Event
Ringøen–Karlsen	Boys' tournament

== Road cycling ==
Norway received a quota place for the girls' road race and road time trial.

Athlete	Event	Time	Rank
Karoline Flaterud	Girls' road race		
Karoline Flaterud	Girls' road time trial		

== Skateboarding ==
Norway received a quota place for the Boys' street event

Athlete	Event	Score	Rank
Silas Aagaard-Hagen	Boys' street		

== Taekwondo ==
Athlete	Event
Sarah Natasha Femer-Pedersen	

== Triathlon ==
Norway received a quota place for the Boys' sprint.

Athlete	Event	Time	Rank
Markus Berget Galleberg	Boys' sprint		
