= Diving at the 2010 Summer Youth Olympics – Boys' 10m platform =

The Boys' 10m platform diving at the 2010 Summer Youth Olympics was held on August 24 at 20:30. 11 competitors featured in this event. Earlier that day there were preliminaries to determine the finalists (13:30 local time).

== Medalists ==
Gold	Qiu Bo; China	673.50
Silver	Oleksandr Bondar; Ukraine	605.55
Bronze	Iván García; Mexico	515.70

== Results ==
Rank	Diver	Preliminary		Final	
Rank	Diver	Points	Rank	Points	Rank
1st place, gold medalist(s)	Qiu Bo (CHN)	643.25	1	673.50	1
2nd place, silver medalist(s)	Oleksandr Bondar (UKR)	563.55	2	605.55	2
3rd place, bronze medalist(s)	Iván García (MEX)	505.55	3	515.70	3
4	Tim Pyritz (GER)	467.50	4	498.30	4
5	Robert Páez (VEN)	464.50	5	483.20	5
6	Hyon Il-myong (PRK)	425.60	7	469.85	6
7	Ooi Tze Liang (MAS)	463.05	6	435.55	7
8	Marc Sabourin-Germain (CAN)	407.75	8	433.05	8
