= Sailing at the 2010 Summer Youth Olympics – Boys' Byte CII =

Boys' Byte CII at the I Summer Youth Olympic Games
- Venue: National Sailing Centre
- Dates: August 17–25, 2010
- Competitors: 29 from 29 nations

Medalists
1st place, gold medalist(s)		Ian Barrows	Virgin Islands
2nd place, silver medalist(s)		Florian Haufe	Germany
3rd place, bronze medalist(s)		Just van Aanholt	Netherlands Antilles

Boys' Byte CII class competition at the 2010 Summer Youth Olympics in Singapore took place from August 17 to August 25 at the National Sailing Centre. 29 sailors competed in this dinghy competition.

Sixteen races were scheduled however, due to bad weather conditions, only 11 races plus the Medal race were contested. Only the 9 best results along with the Medal race result were totaled for the final results.

== Medalists ==
Gold	Ian Barrows; Virgin Islands
Silver	Florian Haufe; Germany
Bronze	Just van Aanholt; Netherlands Antilles

== Results ==
Race M is the medal race.

Rank	Athlete	Race												Net Points
Rank	Athlete	1	2	3	4	5	6	7	8	9	10	11	M	Net Points
1st place, gold medalist(s)	Ian Barrows (ISV)	~~OCS~~	5	8	~~12~~	2	6	4	5	8	2	1	3	44
2nd place, silver medalist(s)	Florain Haufe (GER)	~~DSQ~~	6	7	9	4	1	7	9	3	7	~~10~~	7	60
3rd place, bronze medalist(s)	Just van Aanholt (AHO)	2	1	4	7	19	~~20~~	~~21~~	12	5	3	8	1	62
4	Kaarle Tapper (FIN)	8	3	3	~~20~~	1	10	11	8	~~14~~	9	2	11	66
5	Pavlo Babych (UKR)	~~21~~	13	15	8	10	~~24~~	2	7	1	8	4	4	72
6	Owen Siese (BER)	~~18~~	2	2	11	~~12~~	8	8	6	9	4	11	13	74
7	Darren Wong Loong Choy (SIN)	10	7	~~24~~	2	9	3	3	4	15	13	~~18~~	12	78
8	Marti Llena (ESP)	7	17	1	15	6	7	17	2	~~21~~	6	~~19~~	9	87
9	Marco Benini (ITA)	3	12	16	~~22~~	5	4	15	1	12	18	~~24~~	6	92
10	Gonçalo Pires (POR)	1	8	14	5	~~16~~	14	~~26~~	11	16	11	3	17	100
11	Harald Fæste (NOR)	6	15	6	4	13	5	13	18	~~19~~	~~19~~	13	10	103
12	Žan Luka Zelko (SLO)	9	14	17	16	11	2	~~20~~	16	13	14	~~OCS~~	2	114
13	Wang Zili (CHN)	5	~~24~~	12	1	15	~~26~~	22	24	2	5	6	23	115
14	Mark Spearman (AUS)	4	16	~~18~~	14	8	13	6	10	~~26~~	17	12	15	115
15	Jack Collinson (NZL)	16	4	5	19	14	~~27~~	1	~~21~~	18	16	7	24	124
16	Eduardo Ariza (DOM)	11	~~25~~	20	~~21~~	21	11	9	14	6	15	14	5	126
17	Alexander Elstrodt (BRA)	~~24~~	11	10	6	18	17	5	23	4	~~24~~	17	16	127
18	Muhamad Amirul Jais (MAS)	12	9	~~21~~	13	17	16	12	~~OCS~~	20	12	5	18	134
19	Péter Bathó (HUN)	~~OCS~~	18	26	3	7	9	18	3	17	25	~~OCS~~	14	140
20	Supakon Pongwichean (THA)	17	10	22	17	3	12	10	19	~~25~~	~~27~~	23	8	141
21	Juan Ignacio Biava (ARG)	14	20	~~23~~	18	20	18	~~27~~	17	10	1	9	19	146
22	Sébastien Schneiter (SUI)	22	21	11	10	~~25~~	19	16	~~DSQ~~	7	10	21	20	157
23	Alp Rodopman (TUR)	15	19	9	~~25~~	22	15	25	13	23	~~28~~	25	21	187
24	Aquila Tatira (COK)	23	23	13	~~27~~	26	22	19	15	~~28~~	23	15	25	204
25	Massimo Mazzolini (MON)	20	22	19	26	~~29~~	21	28	22	11	20	~~OCS~~	29	218
26	Valerij Ovcinnikov (LTU)	13	~~29~~	~~29~~	23	28	23	14	26	24	22	22	28	223
27	Saif Ibrahim Al-Hammadi (UAE)	25	~~27~~	~~28~~	24	24	25	23	20	22	21	20	27	231
28	Lester Luis Martínez (CUB)	26	26	25	~~28~~	23	~~28~~	24	25	27	26	16	22	240
29	Anis Elmjid (TUN)	19	28	27	29	27	29	29	27	~~DNF~~	29	~~RAF~~	26	270

=== Notes ===
Scoring abbreviations are defined as follows:

- OCS – On the Course Side of the starting line
- DSQ – Disqualified
- DNF – Did Not Finish
- DNS – Did Not Start
- BFD – Black Flag Disqualification
- RAF – Retired after Finishing
