= Tim Pyritz =

German diver

Personal information
- Born: 14 July 1993 (age 31); Rostock, Germany

Sport
- Sport: Diving

Tim Pyritz (born 14 July 1993) is a German diver that competed at the 2010 Youth Olympic Games in Singapore.

== Personal life ==
Tim Pyritz graduated from Heinrich-Schütz high school in 2010, and currently trains works for Wsc Rostock e.V..

== Competition ==
In 2010 Tim Pyritz competed at the Youth Olympic Games Qualifier in Guadalajara, Mexico, Placing fourth in Platform. This qualified him for the 3m and 10m Diving events at the Youth Olympics.

At the Games, Pyritz placed sixth in the 3m Springboard competition, despite carrying in the largest number of points from the prelims. In the 10m Platform, he was barely beaten to the bronze by Mexico's Ivan Garcia by just 17.4 points.

A few days after the games, Pyritz competed in the 10m Platform at the 18th Fina Junior World Championships in Tucson, Arizona. He finished eighth, 50 points out of medal contention.

== See also ==
Tim Pyritz-10m Youth Olympic Games-Youtube

Tim Pyritz-3m Youth Olympic Games-Youtube
