= Angola at the 2010 Summer Youth Olympics =

- IOC code: ANG
- NOC: Comité Olímpico Angolano

in Singapore
- Competitors: 21 in 5 sports
- Flag bearer: Artemis Afonso
- Medals: Gold 0 Silver 0 Bronze 0 Total 0

Summer Youth Olympics appearances
- 2010; 2014; 2018

Angola participated in the 2010 Summer Youth Olympics in Singapore.

The Angolan team consisted of 21 athletes competing in 5 sports: athletics, basketball, canoeing, handball and swimming.

== Athletics ==
Note: The athletes who do not have a "Q" next to their Qualification Rank advance to a non-medal ranking final.

=== Boys ===
Track and Road Events

Athletes	Event	Qualification		Final	
Athletes	Event	Result	Rank	Result	Rank
Nelson Reis	Boys’ 1000m	2:37.09	19 qB	2:33.74	17

== Basketball ==
Girls

Squad List	Event	Group Stage		Placement Stage			Rank
Squad List	Event	Group B	Rank	9th-16th	13th-16th	15th-16th	Rank
Artemis Afonso (C); Helena Francisco; Elisabeth Mateus; Ana Claudia Goncalves	Girls' Basketball	United States; L 8-30	4	Russia; L 14-28	Czech Republic; L 15-18	Ivory Coast; L 13-15	16
Artemis Afonso (C); Helena Francisco; Elisabeth Mateus; Ana Claudia Goncalves	Girls' Basketball	Belarus; L 11-35	4	Russia; L 14-28	Czech Republic; L 15-18	Ivory Coast; L 13-15	16
Artemis Afonso (C); Helena Francisco; Elisabeth Mateus; Ana Claudia Goncalves	Girls' Basketball	Singapore; W 20-14	4	Russia; L 14-28	Czech Republic; L 15-18	Ivory Coast; L 13-15	16
Artemis Afonso (C); Helena Francisco; Elisabeth Mateus; Ana Claudia Goncalves	Girls' Basketball	Germany; L 17-26	4	Russia; L 14-28	Czech Republic; L 15-18	Ivory Coast; L 13-15	16

== Canoeing ==
Boys

Athlete	Event	Time Trial		Round 1	Round 2 (Rep)	Round 3	Round 4	Round 5	Final
Athlete	Event	Time	Rank	Round 1	Round 2 (Rep)	Round 3	Round 4	Round 5	Final
Jose Chimbumba	Boys’ C1 Slalom	2:22.54	13	Soeter (GER); L 2:19.77-1:43.02	Burisa (CRO); L 2:19.23-1:59.26	Wang (CHN); L 2:21.23-1:34.98	did not advance		
Jose Chimbumba	Boys’ C1 Sprint	2:07.70	12	Sokol (POL); W 2:10.12-DSQ		Cardenas (CUB); L 2:11.81-1:43.44	did not advance		

== Handball ==
Squad List	Event	Group Stage		5th Place Playoffs		Rank
Squad List	Event	Group A	Rank	1st Match	2nd Match	Rank
Valdemira van Dunem; Jeovania Antonio; Jocelina Mateta Yanda; Irina Cailo; Suzeth Isabel Cazanga; Esmeralda Samuconga; Isabel Eduardo; Luiza Matamba; Iovania Valeria Quinzole; Ana Patricia Barros; Sara Cristina Luis; Ngalula Kanka; Albertina Mambrio; Catiana dos Santos	Girls' Handball	Brazil; L 27-30	3	Australia; W 37-12	Australia; W 39-12	5
Valdemira van Dunem; Jeovania Antonio; Jocelina Mateta Yanda; Irina Cailo; Suzeth Isabel Cazanga; Esmeralda Samuconga; Isabel Eduardo; Luiza Matamba; Iovania Valeria Quinzole; Ana Patricia Barros; Sara Cristina Luis; Ngalula Kanka; Albertina Mambrio; Catiana dos Santos	Girls' Handball	Russia; L 22-41	3	Australia; W 37-12	Australia; W 39-12	5

== Swimming ==
Athletes	Event	Heat		Semifinal		Final	
Athletes	Event	Time	Position	Time	Position	Time	Position
Mariana Henriques	Girls’ 50m Breaststroke	37.65	22	Did not advance			
Mariana Henriques	Girls’ 100m Breaststroke	1:26.96	30	Did not advance			
