= Macedonia at the 2010 Summer Youth Olympics =

- IOC code: MKD
- NOC: Macedonian Olympic Committee
- Website: www.mok.org.mk

in Singapore
- Competitors: 6 in 4 sports
- Flag bearer: Simona Marinova
- Medals: Gold 0 Silver 0 Bronze 0 Total 0

Summer Youth Olympics appearances
- 2010; 2014; 2018

Macedonia participated in the 2010 Summer Youth Olympics in Singapore.

The Macedonian squad consisted of six athletes competing in four sports: aquatics (swimming), archery, badminton, and tennis.

== Badminton ==
Girls

Athlete	Event	Group Stage				Knock-Out Stage			
Athlete	Event	Match 1	Match 2	Match 3	Rank	Quarterfinal	Semifinal	Final	Rank
Dragana Volkanovska	Girls’ Singles	Mikkela (FIN) L 0-2 (10-21, 5-21)	Pilven (AUS) L 0-2 (7-21, 3-21)	Marín (ESP) L 0-2 (5-21, 10-21)	4	Did not advance			

== Shooting ==
Pistol

Athlete	Event	Qualification		Final		
Athlete	Event	Score	Rank	Score	Total	Rank
Dijana Petrova	Girls' 10m Air Pistol	363	18	Did not advance		

== Swimming ==
Athletes	Event	Heat		Semifinal		Final	
Athletes	Event	Time	Position	Time	Position	Time	Position
Marko Blaževski	Boys’ 400m Freestyle	4:05.67	17			Did not advance	
Tiana Tasevska	Girls’ 50m Freestyle	28.11	30	Did not advance			
Tiana Tasevska	Girls’ 100m Freestyle	1:01.04	39	Did not advance			
Simona Marinova	Girls’ 100m Freestyle	1:01.21	43	Did not advance			
Simona Marinova	Girls’ 200m Freestyle	2:09.55	28			Did not advance	
Simona Marinova	Girls’ 400m Freestyle	4:25.31	12			Did not advance	

== Tennis ==
Singles

Athlete	Event	Round 1	Round 2	Quarterfinals	Semifinals	Final	Rank
Stefan Micov	Boys' singles	Kovalík (SVK); L 0-2 (5-7, 1-6)	Consolation; Pavić (CRO); W 2-1 (7-6, 5-7, [10-7])	Consolation; Krainik (CAN); W 2-0 (4-3RET)	Consolation; Acosta (ECU); W 2-1 (6-7, 7-6, [10-7])	Consolation; King (BAR); L 0-2 (5-7, 2-6)	

Doubles

Athlete	Event	Round 1	Quarterfinals	Semifinals	Final	Rank
Stefan Micov (MKD); Ahmed Triki (TUN)	Boys' Doubles	Fucsovics (HUN); Zsiga (HUN); L 0-2 (4-6, 2-6)	Did not advance			
