= Wrestling at the 2010 Summer Youth Olympics – Girls' freestyle 52 kg =

The girls' 52 kg tournament in wrestling at the 2010 Summer Youth Olympics was held on August 16 at the International Convention Centre.

The event limited competitors to a maximum of 52 kilograms of body mass. The tournament had two groups where wrestlers compete in a round-robin format. The winners of each group would go on to play for the gold medal, second placers played for the bronze medal while everyone else played for classification depending on where they ranked in the group stage.

== Medalists ==
Gold	Silver	Bronze
Patimat Bagomedova; Azerbaijan	Yuan Yuan; China	Nilufar Gadaeva; Uzbekistan

== Group stages ==
=== Group A ===
Athlete	Pld	C. Points	T. Points
Yuan Yuan (CHN)	3	9	23
Thi Quynh Diem Nguyen (VIE)	3	7	4
Sayury Canon (COL)	3	3	6
Karoline Loevik (NOR)	3	1	6

Yuan Yuan (CHN)	2-0 (3–0, 6–0)	Sayury Canon (COL)
Thi Quynh Diem Nguyen (VIE)	Fall (2–3)	Karoline Loevik (NOR)
Yuan Yuan (CHN)	2-0 (2–0, 4–0)	Thi Quynh Diem Nguyen (VIE)
Sayury Canon (COL)	2-0 (3–2, 3–1)	Karoline Loevik (NOR)
Yuan Yuan (CHN)	2-0 (6–0, 2–0)	Karoline Loevik (NOR)
Sayury Canon (COL)	0-2 (0-1, 0-1)	Thi Quynh Diem Nguyen (VIE)

=== Group B ===
Athlete	Pld	C. Points	T. Points
Patimat Bagomedova (AZE)	3	12	29
Nilufar Gadaeva (UZB)	3	8	14
Sabrina Azzouz (ALG)	3	3	8
Arianna Eustaquio (GUM)	3	0	0

Sabrina Azzouz (ALG)	T. Fall (0-7, 0-6)	Patimat Bagomedova (AZE)
Arianna Eustaquio (GUM)	Fall (0-4)	Nilufar Gadaeva (UZB)
Sarina Azzouz (ALG)	2-0 (1–0, 7–0)	Arianna Eustaquio (GUM)
Patimat Bagomedova (AZE)	Fall (3–0)	Nilufar Gadaeva (UZB)
Sabrina Azzouz (ALG)	T. Fall (0-6, 0-4)	Nilufar Gadaeva (UZB)
Patimat Bagomedova (AZE)	T. Fall (6–0, 7–0)	Arianna Eustaquio (GUM)

== Classification ==
=== 7th-place match ===
Karoline Loevik (NOR)	T. Fall (7–0, 6–0)	Arianna Eustaquio (GUM)

=== 5th-place match ===
Sayury Canon (COL)	Fall (4–0)	Sabrina Azzouz (ALG)

=== Bronze-medal match ===
Thi Quynh Diem Nguyen (VIE)	Fall (0-3, 1–0, 0-4)	Nilufar Gadaeva (UZB)

=== Gold-medal match ===
Yuan Yuan (CHN)	0-2 (2-4, 1-1)	Patimat Bagomedova (AZE)

== Final rankings ==
Rank	Athlete
Gold medal	Patimat Bagomedova (AZE)
Silver medal	Yuan Yuan (CHN)
Bronze medal	Nilufar Gadaeva (UZB)
4	Thi Quynh Diem Nguyen (VIE)
5	Sayury Canon (COL)
6	Sabrina Azzouz (ALG)
7	Karoline Loevik (NOR)
8	Arianna Eustaquio (GUM)
