= Maldives at the 2010 Summer Youth Olympics =

- IOC code: MDV
- NOC: Maldives Olympic Committee

in Singapore
- Competitors: 4 in 3 sports
- Flag bearer: Aishath Afnaan Rasheed

Summer Youth Olympics appearances
- 2010; 2014; 2018

The Maldives competed at the 2010 Summer Youth Olympics, the inaugural Youth Olympic Games, held in Singapore from 14 August to 26 August 2010.

== Athletics ==
Athletes	Event	Qualification		Final	
Athletes	Event	Result	Rank	Result	Rank
Mohamed Sameeh	Boys' 100m	11.44	19 qC	DNS	

== Badminton ==
Athlete	Event	Group Stage				Knock-Out Stage			
Athlete	Event	Match 1	Match 2	Match 3	Rank	Quarterfinal	Semifinal	Final	Rank
Aishath Afaan Rasheed	Girls’ singles	Clausen (DEN) L 0-2 (2-21, 2-21)	Deprez (GER) L 0-2 (5-21, 7-21)	Bangi (UGA) L 1-2 (21-19, 8-21, 12-21)	4	Did not advance			

== Swimming ==
Athletes	Event	Heat		Semifinal		Final	
Athletes	Event	Time	Position	Time	Position	Time	Position
Izudhaadh Ahmed	Boys’ 50m freestyle	DSQ		Did not advance			
Aminath Shajan	Girls’ 50m freestyle	32.81	56	Did not advance			
Aminath Shajan	Girls’ 100m freestyle	1:15.25	54	Did not advance			
