= Diving at the 2010 Summer Youth Olympics – Boys' 3m springboard =

The Boys' 3m springboard competition was held August 22 at 20:30. Fifteen competitors were featured in this event. Earlier that day there were preliminaries to determine the finalists (13:30 local time).

== Medalists ==
Gold	Qiu Bo; China	607.15
Silver	Oleksandr Bondar; Ukraine	565.35
Bronze	Michael Hixon; United States	554.65

== Results ==
Rank	Diver	Preliminary		Final	
Rank	Diver	Points	Rank	Points	Rank
1st place, gold medalist(s)	Qiu Bo (CHN)	618.75	1	607.15	1
2nd place, silver medalist(s)	Oleksandr Bondar (UKR)	556.65	2	565.35	2
3rd place, bronze medalist(s)	Michael Hixon (USA)	541.15	3	554.65	3
4	Giovanni Tocci (ITA)	521.90	5	547.50	4
5	Abel Ramirez Tellez (CUB)	503.75	6	543.15	5
6	Tim Pyritz (GER)	476.45	9	524.45	6
7	Ooi Tze Liang (MAS)	495.20	8	523.70	7
8	Miguel Angel Reyes (COL)	502.20	7	521.95	8
9	Tom Daley (GBR)	527.10	4	514.35	9
10	Marc Sabourin-Germain (CAN)	474.20	10	506.50	10
11	Ivan Garcia (MEX)	443.80	12	497.80	11
12	Robert Paez (VEN)	452.65	11	458.70	12
13	Gevorg Papoyan (ARM)	385.25	13	-	-
14	Pedro Abreu (BRA)	366.85	14	-	-
15	Timothy Lee Han Kuan (SIN)	365.50	15	-	-
