= Tour de l'Oeuf Complex =

Sports complex in Dakar, Senegal

- Complexe Tour de l'Oeuf
- Dakar Aquatic Centre
- Interactive map of Tour de l'Oeuf Complex
- Address: Point E District; Dakar; Senegal
- Coordinates: 14°41′47.3″N 17°27′41.1″W
- Type: Sports complex
- Main venue: Dakar Aquatic Centre; Capacity: 2,500

Construction
- Opened: 2002 (Note: Conflicting reports. 30 April or 17 May)
- Renovated: 2021–2026

The Tour de l'Oeuf Complex (French: Complexe Tour de l'Oeuf) is a sports complex in Dakar, Senegal.

== History ==
The Tour de l'Oeuf Complex is an oval shape (from the French word for egg which is Oeuf), sports complex at the Point E residential district in Dakar. Its main venue, the Olympic Swimming Pool was inaugurated in 2002 by President Abdoulaye Wade. The facility was built in five years for 5 billion CFA francs.

Other facilities include two football fields, a basketball court, one volleyball court, two tennis courts, a children's playground, and a pétanque venue.

In 2018, the Tour de l'Oeuf Complex is reportedly in a dilapidated state.

The facility was renovated for the 2026 Summer Youth Olympics. The groundbreaking for a renovated swimming pool was held in 2021. The facility was officially turned over to the government in July 2026. The new swimming pool venue alone has 2,500 seats.

Aside from swimming, the baseball5, 3x3 basketball, breaking, and skateboarding Summer Youth Olympics events were also held at the Tour de l'Oeuf Complex. The total seating capacity given during this period is 5,000.
