= Canoeing at the 2010 Summer Youth Olympics – Boys' C1 sprint =

These are the results of the boys' C1 sprint event at the 2010 Summer Youth Olympics. It took place at the Marina Reservoir. Time Trial Round was on August 21, 2010. First elimination round, repechage and third round took place on August 21, and quarterfinals, semifinals and medals rounds were on August 22.

== Medalists ==
Gold	Osvaldo Sacerio Cardenas; Cuba
Silver	Anatolii Melnyk; Ukraine
Bronze	Pedro Castañeda; Mexico

== Time Trial ==
Rank	Athlete	Time
1	Isaquias Queiroz (BRA)	1:41.53
2	Osvaldo Sacerio Cardenas (CUB)	1:42.77
3	Timofey Yemelyanov (KAZ)	1:44.21
4	Anatolii Melnyk (UKR)	1:44.89
5	Patryk Sokol (POL)	1:45.06
6	Pedro Castañeda (MEX)	1:46.64
7	Andrei Liferi (ROU)	1:47.74
8	Alexandru Tiganu (MDA)	1:48.88
9	Radoslav Kutsev (AZE)	1:49.89
10	Matija Burisa (CRO)	1:59.77
11	Wang Xiaodong (CHN)	2:02.09
12	Jose Chimbumba (ANG)	2:07.70
13	Edgar Babayan (ARM)	2:23.02
14	Dennis Soeter (GER)	2:47.52
15	Hayden Daniels (CAN)	3:33.76
	Alexey Volgin (RUS)	DSQ

== First round ==
The winners advanced to the 3rd round along with the first placed athlete at the Time Trial. Losers raced at the repechages.

Match 1

Name	Time
Osvaldo Sacerio Cardenas (CUB)	1:45.11
Hayden Daniels (CAN)	3:29.00

Match 2

Name	Time
Timofey Yemelyanov (KAZ)	1:48.29
Dennis Soeter (GER)	2:53.93

Match 3

Name	Time
Anatolii Melnyk (UKR)	1:46.61
Edgar Babayan (ARM)	2:22.00

Match 4

Name	Time
Jose Chimbumba (ANG)	2:10.12
Patryk Sokol (POL)	DSQ

Match 5

Name	Time
Pedro Castañeda (MEX)	1:48.37
Wang Xiaodong (CHN)	2:05.51

Match 6

Name	Time
Andrei Liferi (ROU)	1:50.58
Matija Burisa (CRO)	1:59.78

Match 7

Name	Time
Radoslav Kutsev (AZE)	1:48.33
Alexandru Tiganu (MDA)	1:51.08

== Repechage ==
The winners and fastest loser advanced to the 3rd round.

Repechage 1

Name	Time
Alexandru Tiganu (MDA)	1:47.83
Hayden Daniels (CAN)	DNF

Repechage 2

Name	Time
Matija Burisa (CRO)	2:08.64
Dennis Soeter (GER)	2:42.83

Repechage 3

Name	Time
Wang Xiaodong (CHN)	2:07.19
Edgar Babayan (ARM)	2:22.45

== Third round ==
The winners and two fastest losers advanced to the 4th round.

Match 1

Name	Time
Isaquias Queiroz (BRA)	1:44.89
Edgar Babayan (ARM)	2:22.29

Match 2

Name	Time
Osvaldo Sacerio Cardenas (CUB)	1:43.44
Jose Chimbumba (ANG)	2:11.81

Match 3

Name	Time
Anatolii Melnyk (UKR)	1:45.84
Matija Burisa (CRO)	2:01.89

Match 4

Name	Time
Alexandru Tiganu (MDA)	1:48.70
Wang Xiaodong (CHN)	2:02.75

Match 5

Name	Time
Andrei Liferi (ROU)	1:48.22
Timofey Yemelyanov (KAZ)	1:48.55

Match 6

Name	Time
Pedro Castañeda (MEX)	1:49.45
Radoslav Kutsev (AZE)	1:54.97

== Quarterfinals ==
Match 1

Name	Time
Osvaldo Sacerio Cardenas (CUB)	1:47.23
Radoslav Kutsev (AZE)	1:52.31

Match 2

Name	Time
Pedro Castañeda (MEX)	1:49.74
Isaquias Queiroz (BRA)	1:53.21

Match 3

Name	Time
Anatolii Melnyk (UKR)	1:50.25
Alexandru Tiganu (MDA)	1:50.57

Match 4

Name	Time
Andrei Liferi (ROU)	1:54.80
Timofey Yemelyanov (KAZ)	DNF

== Semifinals ==
Match 1

Name	Time
Osvaldo Sacerio Cardenas (CUB)	1:48.43
Andrei Liferi (ROU)	2:02.06

Match 2

Name	Time
Anatolii Melnyk (UKR)	1:51.11
Pedro Castañeda (MEX)	1:51.20

== Finals ==
Match 1

Rank	Name	Time
1st place, gold medalist(s)	Osvaldo Sacerio Cardenas (CUB)	1:48.37
2nd place, silver medalist(s)	Anatolii Melnyk (UKR)	1:51.17

Match 2

Rank	Name	Time
3rd place, bronze medalist(s)	Pedro Castañeda (MEX)	1:53.45
4	Andrei Liferi (ROU)	1:54.24
