= Monaco at the 2010 Summer Youth Olympics =

- IOC code: MON
- NOC: Monaco Olympic Committee
- Website: www.comite-olympique.mc

in Singapore
- Competitors: 4 in 4 sports
- Flag bearer: Pauline Ducruet
- Medals: Gold 0 Silver 0 Bronze 0 Total 0

Summer Youth Olympics appearances
- 2010; 2014; 2018

Monaco participated in the 2010 Summer Youth Olympics in Singapore.

The Monaco squad consisted of 4 athletes competing in 3 sports: aquatics (diving, swimming), sailing and taekwondo.{cn}

== Diving ==
Girls

Athlete	Event	Preliminary		Final	
Athlete	Event	Points	Rank	Points	Rank
Pauline Ducruet	Girls’ 3m Springboard	341.75	10 Q	326.45	12

== Sailing ==
One Person Dinghy

Athlete	Event	Race												Points	Rank
Athlete	Event	1	2	3	4	5	6	7	8	9	10	11	M*	Points	Rank
Massimo Mazzolini	Boys' Byte CII	20	22	19	26	~~29~~	21	28	22	11	20	~~OCS~~	29	218	25

== Swimming ==
Athletes	Event	Heat		Semifinal		Final	
Athletes	Event	Time	Position	Time	Position	Time	Position
Angélique Trinquier	Girls’ 100m Freestyle	1:05.04	47	Did not advance			

== Taekwondo ==
Athlete	Event	Preliminary	Quarterfinal	Semifinal	Final	Rank
Christopher Deleage	Boys' -73kg	Tahir Gulec (GER); L 2-12	Did not advance			9
