= Simone Scherer =

Swiss trampoline gymnast

- Born: 9 April 1994 (age 32)

Gymnastics career
- Discipline: Trampoline gymnastics
- Country represented: Switzerland; (2013)

Simone Scherer (born 9 April 1994) was a Swiss individual trampolinist, representing her nation at international competitions.

She competed at world championships, including at the 2013 Trampoline World Championships. She participated at the 2010 Summer Youth Olympics.
