= Malaysia at the 2010 Summer Youth Olympics =

- IOC code: MAS
- NOC: Olympic Council of Malaysia
- Website: www.olympic.org.my (in English)

in Singapore
- Competitors: 13 in 6 sports
- Flag bearer: Pandelela Rinong Pamg
- Medals Ranked 65th: Gold 0 Silver 2 Bronze 0 Total 2

Summer Youth Olympics appearances (overview)
- 2010; 2014; 2018

Malaysia participated in the 2010 Summer Youth Olympics in Singapore. The Malaysian team consisted of 13 athletes, seven male and six female, who competed in six sports: aquatics (swimming and diving), athletics, badminton, rhythmic gymnastics, sailing and weightlifting. The chef-de-mission of the contingent was former national swimmer Alex Lim, who competed in the 2004 Summer Olympics in Athens.

Diver Pandelela Rinong Pamg became the first Malaysian to win a medal in the Youth Olympics after placing second in the girls' 10m platform event. She later won another silver medal in the girls' 3m springboard event.

== Medalists ==
Medal	Name	Sport	Event	Date
Silver	Pandelela Rinong	Diving	Girls' 10 metre platform	21 August
Silver	Pandelela Rinong	Diving	Girls' 3 metre springboard	23 August

== Athletics ==
Boys
Track event

Athletes	Event	Qualification		Final	
Athletes	Event	Result	Rank	Result	Rank
Muhd Ajmal Aiman Mat Hasan	110 m hurdles	14.54	13 qB	14.48	11

Field events

Athletes	Event	Qualification		Final	
Athletes	Event	Result	Rank	Result	Rank
Navinraj Subramaniam	High jump	2.10	5 Q	2.08	8
M. Fahme Zamzam Mehamed	Pole vault	4.00	15 qB	4.20	13

== Badminton ==
Boys

Athlete	Event	Group Stage				Knock-Out Stage			
Athlete	Event	Match 1	Match 2	Match 3	Rank	Quarterfinal	Semifinal	Final	Rank
Loh Wei Sheng	Singles	Ghislain (SEY) W 2–0 (21–8, 21–5)	Lale (TUR) W 2–0 (21–17, 21–9)	Nguyen (VIE) W 2–0 (21–6, 21–12)	1 Q	Huang (SIN) W 2–0 (21–18, 21–16)	Poodchalat (THA) L 1–2 (13–21, 21–19, 3–21(RET))	Bronze Medal Match; Kang (KOR) L WD	4

Girls

Athlete	Event	Group Stage				Knock-Out Stage			
Athlete	Event	Match 1	Match 2	Match 3	Rank	Quarterfinal	Semifinal	Final	Rank
Sonia Cheah Su Ya	Singles	Ugalde (MEX) W 2–0 (21–14, 21–9)	Azeez (NGR) W 2–0 (21–7, 21–10)	Tunali (TUR) W 2–0 (21–7, 21–9)	1 Q	Taerattanachai (THA) L 0–2 (15–21, 16–21)	Did not advance		5

== Diving ==
Boys

Athlete	Event	Preliminary		Final	
Athlete	Event	Points	Rank	Points	Rank
Ooi Tze Liang	3 m springboard	495.20	8 Q	523.70	7
Ooi Tze Liang	10 m platform	463.05	6 Q	435.55	7

Girls

Athlete	Event	Preliminary		Final	
Athlete	Event	Points	Rank	Points	Rank
Pandelela Rinong	3 m springboard	439.25	2 Q	444.15	Silver medal
Pandelela Rinong	10 m platform	414.30	2 Q	454.35	Silver medal

== Gymnastics ==
=== Rhythmic ===
Girls

Athlete	Event	Qualification						Final					
Athlete	Event	Rope Rank	Hoop Rank	Ball Rank	Clubs Rank	Total	Rank	Rope Rank	Hoop Rank	Ball Rank	Clubs Rank	Total	Rank
Lee Wan Nin	Individual all-around	23.800; 5	24.075; 5	24.100; 5	24.425; 4	96.400	5 Q	24.150; 4	24.700; 2	25.050; 4	24.300; 5	98.200	4

== Sailing ==
One Person Dinghy

Athlete	Event	Race												Points	Rank
Athlete	Event	1	2	3	4	5	6	7	8	9	10	11	M*	Points	Rank
Muhamad Amirul Shafiq Jais	Boys' Byte CII	12	9	~~21~~	13	17	16	12	~~OCS~~	20	12	5	18	134	18
Khairunneesa Mohammad Afendy	Girls' Byte CII	4	11	~~18~~	4	~~15~~	14	8	10	7	8	9	10	85	7

== Swimming ==
Athletes	Event	Heat		Semifinal		Final	
Athletes	Event	Time	Position	Time	Position	Time	Position
Kevin Lim Kar Meng	Boys’ 200 m freestyle	1:55.96	26			Did not advance	
Kevin Lim Kar Meng	Boys’ 400 m freestyle	4:05.53	16			Did not advance	
Lai Wei Li	Girls’ 200 m freestyle	2:09.66	31			Did not advance	
Lai Wei Li	Girls’ 400 m freestyle	4:30.92	18			Did not advance	
Lai Wei Li	Girls’ 200 m individual medley	DSQ				Did not advance	

== Weightlifting ==
Athlete	Event	Snatch	Clean & Jerk	Total	Rank
Fatin Atikah Osman	Girls' 58 kg	70	80	150	7
