= Diving at the 2010 Summer Youth Olympics – Girls' 3m springboard =

The Girls' 3m springboard competition was held on August 23 at 20:30. 13 competitors featured this event. Earlier that day there were preliminaries to determine the finalists (13:30 local time).

== Medalists ==
Gold	Liu Jiao; China	511.35
Silver	Pandelela Rinong; Malaysia	444.15
Bronze	Viktoriya Potyekhina; Ukraine	433.55

== Results ==
Rank	Diver	Preliminary		Final	
Rank	Diver	Points	Rank	Points	Rank
1st place, gold medalist(s)	Liu Jiao (CHN)	505.35	1	511.35	1
2nd place, silver medalist(s)	Pandelela Rinong (MAS)	439.25	2	444.15	2
3rd place, bronze medalist(s)	Viktoriya Potyekhina (UKR)	388.55	5	433.55	3
4	Pamela Ware (CAN)	411.45	3	431.55	4
5	Hannah Thek (AUS)	385.70	6	428.00	5
6	Elena Bertocchi (ITA)	404.85	4	411.50	6
7	Kieu Duong (GER)	341.70	11	387.70	7
8	Annika Lenz (USA)	341.45	12	380.70	8
9	Fanny Bouvet (FRA)	353.20	8	369.60	9
10	Beannelys Velasquez (VEN)	342.45	9	359.20	10
11	Teresa Vallejo (MEX)	360.35	7	348.90	11
12	Pauline Ducruet (MON)	341.75	10	326.45	12
13	Chloe Chan (SIN)	313.95	13	-	-
