= He Jianbin =

Chinese swimmer (born 1993)

Personal information
- Born: February 18, 1993 (age 33) Jiangmen, Guangdong

Sport
- Sport: Swimming
- Strokes: Backstroke
Medal record
Representing China
Youth Olympic Games
Gold medal – first place	2010 Singapore	100m backstroke
Gold medal – first place	2010 Singapore	Mixed 4x100m freestyle relay
Gold medal – first place	2010 Singapore	Mixed 4x100m medley relay
Silver medal – second place	2010 Singapore	4x100m freestyle relay

He Jianbin (Chinese: 何健彬, pinyin: Hé Jiàn Bīn, born February 18, 1993) is a Chinese swimmer. At the 2012 Summer Olympics he finished 21st overall in the heats in the Men's 100 metre backstroke and failed to reach the semifinals.

== See also ==
- China at the 2012 Summer Olympics - Swimming
