= Yuan Yuan (wrestler) =

Chinese wrestler (born 1993)

Medal record

Representing China

Women's wrestling

Youth Olympic Games
Gold medal – first place	2010 Singapore	52 kg

Yuan Yuan (Chinese: 袁媛, born 1993) is a Chinese wrestler who participated at the 2010 Summer Youth Olympics in Singapore. She won the silver medal in the girls' freestyle 52 kg event, losing to Patimat Bagomedova of Azerbaijan in the final.
