= Megan Sylvester =

British synchronised diver (born 1994)

Personal information
- Born: 4 July 1994 (age 32) Barnsley, Great Britain

Sport
- Sport: Diving
Medal record
Representing Great Britain
European Championships
Bronze medal – third place	2010 Budapest	10m synchro platform

Megan Sylvester (born 4 July 1994) is a synchronised diver. Her current height is 1.54 m (5 ft 1 in) and she weighs 40 kg (88 lb). Her team is city of Sheffield. Megan Sylvester began diving in 2002 at the age of eight following her older brother.

== International record ==
In her international competitions she has won one bronze and one silver with three 4th, one 8th, one 6th and one 10th. On the other hand, in her domestic events she got four golds, one silver, one 10th and lastly one 4th.

As a junior, she won all three platform events at the British junior nationals, and then won silver at the junior European championships platform final in 2008 following with a 4th-place finish at the junior world championships later that year. In 2009, she teamed up with Monique Gladding and won 6th place at the senior world championships in the synchro event the same year.

Sylvester's ambition was to win a gold medal on home soil at the 2012 Summer Olympics in London. She has described her greatest achievements as winning a silver medal at the 2008 European Junior Championships and finishing fourth at the 2008 World Junior Championships.
