= Dai Jun (swimmer) =

Chinese swimmer (born 1992)

Personal information
- Born: February 6, 1992 (age 34) Shanghai, China

Sport
- Sport: Swimming
Medal record
Representing China
Olympic Games
Bronze medal – third place	2012 London	4×200 m freestyle
Youth Olympic Games
Gold medal – first place	2010 Singapore	400m freestyle
Silver medal – second place	2010 Singapore	4x100m freestyle relay
Asian Games
Gold medal – first place	2010 Guangzhou	4x200m freestyle relay

Dai Jun (Chinese: 戴骏; pinyin: Dài Jùn; born 6 February 1992) is a Chinese swimmer. He competed for China at the 2012 Summer Olympics, and was one of the team that won bronze in the men's 4 x 200 m freestyle race. He was also part of the Chinese team that won the 4 x 200 m freestyle race at the 2010 Asian Games.
