= Diving at the 2014 Summer Youth Olympics =

Diving at the II Summer Youth Olympic Games
- Venue: Nanjing Olympic Sports Centre
- Dates: 23–27 August

Diving at the 2014 Summer Youth Olympics was held from 23 to 27 August at the Nanjing Olympic Sports Centre in Nanjing, China.

== Qualification ==
Each National Olympic Committee (NOC) could gain a maximum of 4 quotas, 1 per each event and enter 2 athletes, 1 in each gender. As hosts, China was given the maximum quota. 8 athletes, 2 in each event was decided by the Tripartite Commission, but none were given thus the spots were reallocated to the next best athletes not yet qualified. The remaining 36 places were decided in a single qualifying event held in 2014.

Athletes must have been born between 1 January 1996 and 31 December 1998 to be eligible to participate at the 2014 Youth Olympics.

=== 3m Springboard ===
Event	Location	Date	Total Places	Qualified Boys	Qualified Girls
Host Nation	-	-	1	China	China
Nanjing 2014 – Diving Qualifying Event	(Mexico) Guadalajara	1–2 March 2014	11	Mexico; Germany; United States; Canada; Ukraine; Belarus; Switzerland; Norway; Italy; Colombia; France	Mexico; United States; Colombia; Ukraine; Germany; Sweden; Brazil; Italy; Canada; Malaysia; Switzerland
TOTAL				12	12

=== 10m Platform ===
Event	Location	Date	Total Places	Qualified Boys	Qualified Girls
Host Nation	-	-	1	China	China
Nanjing 2014 – Diving Qualifying Event	(Mexico) Guadalajara	1–2 March 2014	11	Mexico; Ukraine; Colombia; Norway; Canada; Germany; Armenia; Singapore; France; Egypt	Mexico; Brazil; Ukraine; Colombia; Malaysia; Egypt; United States; France; Canada; Belarus
TOTAL				11	11

== Schedule ==
The schedule was released by the Nanjing Youth Olympic Games Organizing Committee.

All times are CST (UTC+8)

Event date	Event day	Starting time	Event details
August 23	Saturday	10:00	Girls' 10m Platform Preliminary
August 23	Saturday	17:00	Girls' 10m Platform Final
August 24	Sunday	10:00	Boys' 3m Springboard Preliminary
August 24	Sunday	17:00	Boys' 3m Springboard Final
August 25	Monday	10:00	Girls' 3m Springboard Preliminary
August 25	Monday	17:00	Girls' 3m Springboard Final
August 26	Tuesday	10:00	Boys' 10m Platform Preliminary
August 26	Tuesday	17:00	Boys' 10m Platform Final
August 27	Wednesday	16:00	Mixed Team Final

== Medal summary ==
=== Medal table ===
Rank	Nation	Gold	Silver	Bronze	Total
1	China (CHN)	4	0	0	4
2	Mexico (MEX)	0	1	2	3
3	Canada (CAN)	0	1	1	2
3	Malaysia (MAS)	0	1	1	2
5	Ukraine (UKR)	0	1	0	1
Totals (5 entries)		4	4	4	12

=== Results ===
Event	Gold	Silver	Bronze
Boys' 3m springboard	Yang Hao; China	Rodrigo Diego López; Mexico	Philippe Gagné; Canada
Boys' 10m platform	Yang Hao; China	Philippe Gagné; Canada	Rodrigo Diego López; Mexico
Girls' 3m springboard	Wu Shengping; China	Hanna Krasnoshlyk; Ukraine	Loh Zhiayi; Malaysia
Girls' 10m platform	Wu Shengping; China	Loh Zhiayi; Malaysia	Alejandra Orozco; Mexico
Mixed team	Alejandra Orozco; Mexico; Daniel Jensen; Norway	Wu Shengping; China; Mohab Elkordy; Egypt	Gracia Leydon Mahoney; United States; Pylyp Tkachenko; Ukraine
