= Dong Yu (gymnast) =

Chinese gymnast

Dong Yu (Chinese: 董钰; pinyin: Dǒng Yù) is a Chinese gymnast. She won a gold medal in the Women's trampoline event at the 2010 Summer Youth Olympics.
