= Viktoriya Potyekhina =

Ukrainian diver (born 1993)

Personal information
- Born: 14 May 1993 (age 33) Zaporizhia, Ukraine

Sport
- Sport: Diving
Medal record
Representing Ukraine
Youth Olympic Games
| Bronze medal – third place | 2010 Singapore | 3 m springboard |
European Championships
| Silver medal – second place | 2012 Eindhoven | 10m platform synchro |

Viktoriya Potyekhina (born 14 May 1993) is a Ukrainian diver.

== Career ==
She competed in the 10 m platform synchronized event at the 2012 Summer Olympics with her partner Yulia Prokopchuk. A few months earlier, the pair won the silver medal at the 10 m synchro event of the European Aquatics Championships.
