= Liu Jiao (diver) =

Chinese diver (born 1994)

Personal information
- Native name: 刘娇
- Born: March 13, 1994 (age 32) Jilin, China

Sport
- Country: China
- Sport: Diving
Medal record
Representing China
Women's diving
Summer Youth Olympic Games
Gold medal – first place	2010 Singapore	10m Platform
Gold medal – first place	2010 Singapore	3m Springboard
World Junior Diving Championships
Gold medal – first place	2012 Adelaide	1m Springboard
Gold medal – first place	2012 Adelaide	Synchro 3m Springboard
Asian Youth Games
Gold medal – first place	2009 Singapore	10m Platform
East Asian Games
Silver medal – second place	2009 Hong Kong	1m Springboard

Liu Jiao (Chinese: 刘娇; pinyin: Liú Jiāo; born March 13, 1994) is a Chinese diver. She won the women's 10 m platform title at the inaugural 2009 Asian Youth Games, and claimed both the women's 10 m platform and 3 m springboard gold medals at the 2010 Summer Youth Olympics. According to World Aquatics, she won 17 international medals over her career, including 6 gold, 9 silver, and 2 bronze.

== Career ==
=== 2008–2009 ===
In 2008, Liu won the women's synchro 3 m springboard event at the National Diving Star Meet. In 2009, she won the women's all-around final at the National Diving Championships with a score of 663.80, and took the gold medal in the women's 10 m platform at the inaugural 2009 Asian Youth Games in Singapore. She also won the women's synchro 10 m platform at the FINA Diving Grand Prix Madrid leg and finished runner-up in the individual 10 m platform at the same event.

In December 2009, she won the silver medal in the women's 1 m springboard final at the 2009 East Asian Games in Hong Kong with a score of 294.05.

That year, Liu also claimed two gold medals (individual and mixed synchro) at the National Diving Championships. At the 11th National Games, competing as a dual-scoring athlete for the Bayi team, she earned 10.5 points for the Jilin provincial delegation through fourth place in synchro 3 m springboard, eighth place in synchro 10 m platform, and sixth place in the team event.

=== 2010 Youth Olympics ===
The 2010 Summer Youth Olympics allowed each country to enter only two divers across four events, requiring athletes to compete in both springboard and platform. Liu qualified on the strength of her national all-around title the previous year, and skipped the National Diving Star Series to prepare for the Games. Before the competition, she was regarded as a successor to Olympic champion Chen Ruolin.

On August 21, the women's 10 m platform final was held at the Toa Payoh Swimming Complex as the first diving final of the Games. Liu topped the preliminary round with 491.45 points; under the Youth Olympics format, part of the preliminary score carried into the final, placing her second before the final's four rounds. She executed a dive with a 3.2 degree of difficulty on her fourth attempt to clinch the gold with 479.60 points. Malaysia's Pandelela Rinong took silver with 454.35, and North Korea's Sin Kye-hyang won bronze with 430.20.

On August 23, the women's 3 m springboard final was held in rain. Liu led the preliminary round with 505.35 points and won the gold with 511.35 points, finishing more than 67 points ahead of silver medalist Pandelela Rinong. She was the only finalist among the twelve competitors whose dives all had a degree of difficulty of 3.0 or above.

=== 2011–2013 ===
After the Youth Olympics, Liu shifted her focus from platform to springboard. Between 2011 and 2012, she reached the podium several times on the FINA Diving Grand Prix circuit in the women's 3 m springboard, including runner-up finishes at the Penza, Madrid, and Bolzano legs, as well as a third-place finish in Montreal.

In 2011, Liu partnered with Zhou Lüxin to win the mixed all-around title at the National Diving Championships, which also served as the Olympic trials; however, mixed all-around was not an Olympic event, and she did not qualify for the 2012 Summer Olympics. In October 2012, she won the women's 1 m springboard and women's synchro 3 m springboard titles at the World Junior Diving Championships in Adelaide, and was re-selected for the national diving training squad to focus on the women's 3 m springboard.

In 2013, Liu turned her attention to the women's synchro 3 m springboard, winning the event at the Grand Prix legs in Madrid, Rostock, and Gatineau, with her best score of 317.70 coming at Gatineau. After the Fort Lauderdale leg in May 2013, she had no further international competition records.
