= Israel at the Youth Olympics =

- IOC code: ISR
- NOC: Olympic Committee of Israel
- Website: www.olympicsil.co.il (in Hebrew and English)
- Medals Ranked 54th: Gold 4 Silver 5 Bronze 4 Total 13

Summer appearances
- 2010; 2014; 2018; 2026

Winter appearances
- 2016; 2020; 2024

Israel first participated at the Youth Olympic Games at the inaugural 2010 Games. Israel has sent a team to each Summer Youth Olympic Games and to Winter Youth Olympic Games since 2016.

== Medal tables ==
=== Medals by Summer Games ===
Games	Gold	Silver	Bronze	Total	Rank
2010 Singapore	3	2	0	5	15
(Argentina) 2018 Buenos Aires	1	1	1	3	52
(Senegal) 2026 Dakar	0	1	2	3	67
Total	4	4	3	11	49

=== Medals by Winter Games ===
Games	Gold	Silver	Bronze	Total	Rank
(Switzerland) 2020 Lausanne	0	1	1	2	25
Total	0	1	1	2	33

=== Medals by summer sport ===
Sport	Gold	Silver	Bronze	Total
Swimming	1	2	2	5
Athletics	1	0	0	1
Sailing	1	0	0	1
Taekwondo	1	0	0	1
Gymnastics	0	1	1	2
Boxing	0	1	0	1
Totals (6 entries)	4	4	3	11

=== Medals by winter sport ===
Sport	Gold	Silver	Bronze	Total
Alpine skiing	0	1	1	2
Totals (1 entries)	0	1	1	2

=== List of medalists ===
Medal	Name	Games	Sport	Event
Gold	Gili Haimovitz	2010 Singapore	Taekwondo	Boys' 48 kg
Gold	Dmitri Kroytor	2010 Singapore	Athletics	Boys' High Jump
Gold	Mayan Rafic	2010 Singapore	Sailing	Boys' Windsurfing (Techno 293)
Silver	Yakov Toumarkin	2010 Singapore	Swimming	Boys' 100m Backstroke
Silver	Yakov Toumarkin	2010 Singapore	Swimming	Boys' 200m Backstroke
Gold	Anastasia Gorbenko	(Argentina) 2018 Buenos Aires	Swimming	Girls' 200m individual medley
Silver	Yonatan Fridman; Noa Kazado Yakar	(Argentina) 2018 Buenos Aires	Gymnastics	Acrobatic mixed pairs
Bronze	Denis Loktev	(Argentina) 2018 Buenos Aires	Swimming	Boys' 200m freestyle
Silver	Noa Szollos	(Switzerland) 2020 Lausanne	Alpine skiing	Combined
Bronze	Noa Szollos	(Switzerland) 2020 Lausanne	Alpine skiing	Super-G
Silver	Artur Prohnevsky	(Senegal) 2026 Dakar	Boxing	Men's -65 kg
Bronze	Ofir Simcha	(Senegal) 2026 Dakar	Swimming	Girls' 200 m backstroke
Bronze	Ophir Shmuely; Tomer Tirosh	(Senegal) 2026 Dakar	Artistic gymnastics	Mixed team

== Flag bearers ==
#	Games	Season	Flag bearer	Sport
5	2020 Lausanne	Winter	Nikita Kovalenko	Figure skating
4	2018 Buenos Aires	Summer	Avishag Semberg	Taekwondo
3	2016 Lillehammer	Winter	Itamar Biran	Alpine skiing
2	2014 Nanjing	Summer	Yoav Omer	Sailing
1	2010 Singapore	Summer	Naomi Cohen	Sailing

== Youth Olympic participants ==
=== Summer Youth Olympics ===
Sport	2010	2014	2018	2026	Total
Archery		1		2	3
Athletics	1	2	3	2	8
Basketball	4				4
Boxing				1	1
Cycling			2		2
Fencing				1	1
Gymnastics	1	2	4	2	9
Judo	2	1	1	1	5
Sailing	2	2	2	1	7
Swimming	3	4	4	1	12
Table tennis		1			1
Taekwondo	1		2		3
Triathlon	1	1	1		3
Total	15	14	19	11	59

=== Winter Youth Olympics ===
Sport	2016	2020	2024	Total
Alpine skiing	1	1		2
Figure skating	1	1	1	3
Freestyle skiing		1		1
Total	2	3	1	6
