= 3x3 basketball at the 2010 Summer Youth Olympics =

Basketball at the I Summer Youth Olympic Games
- Venue: scape Youth Space
- Dates: 15 – 23 August 2010
- No. of events: 2 (1 boys, 1 girls)
- Competitors: 160 (80 boys, 80 girls) from 38 nations

== Overview ==
3x3 basketball was played for the first time at the 2010 Summer Youth Olympics in Singapore. It introduced a new half-court style of basketball that was faster and focused more on teamwork and quick play.

Each team had four players, three on the court and one on the bench. The games were played on a smaller court with only one basket and a twelve-second shot clock, which made the game move quicker than regular basketball.

There were both boys and girls tournaments, and teams came from many different countries around the world.

Source: https://olympics.com/ioc/news/ten-years-on-memorable-moments-from-singapore-2010)

Basketball at the 2010 Summer Youth Olympics was contested by 20 teams each in the boys' and girls' tournament. The tournaments followed the FIBA 3x3 rules and was held at the Youth Space, Singapore.

== Major rules ==
- Only half of the basketball court is used for the game.
- Each team consists of 3 players and 1 substitute.
- Game time: Two 5-minute periods or a team scores 33 points or more, whichever comes first. If tied at the end of regulation, 2-minute overtimes are used until the tie is broken or a team reaches 33 points.
- Team must attempt a shot for goal in 10 seconds.
- Ball must be taken out of the 3-point line and touched by 2 teammates (ball receiver/dribbler and 1 other teammate) before a shot can be attempted.

== Fixtures and results ==
The group stage draw was made on 31 May 2010.

== Medal summary ==
| Event | Gold | Silver | Bronze |
|---|---|---|---|
| Boys' | Serbia; Saša Avramović; Marko Radonjić; Nemanja Bezbradica; Stefan Popovski-Turanjanin | Croatia; Matej Buovac; Tomislav Grubišić; Stipe Krstanović; Marko Ramljak | Greece; Theodoros Tsiloulis; Spyridon Panagiotaras; Lampros Vlachos; Emmanuel Tselentakis |
| Girls' | China; Ma Xueya; Shen Yi; Jin Jiabao; Yang Xi | Australia; Olivia Bontempelli; Hannah Kaser; Mikhaela Donnelly; Rosemary Fadljevic | United States; Briyona Canty; Andraya Carter; Amber Henson; Kiah Stokes |

== Participating teams ==
=== Boys ===
Group A

- Greece
- India
- New Zealand
- Puerto Rico
- Serbia

Group B

- Argentina
- Egypt
- Iran
- Lithuania
- Panama

Group C

- Central African Republic
- Israel
- Singapore
- Turkey
- United States

Group D

- Croatia
- Philippines
- South Africa
- Spain
- Virgin Islands

=== Girls ===
Group A

- Canada
- Ivory Coast
- South Korea
- Russia
- Vanuatu

Group B

- Angola
- Belarus
- Germany
- Singapore
- United States

Group C

- Brazil
- China
- Czech Republic
- Mali
- Thailand

Group D

- Australia
- Chile
- France
- Italy
- Japan
