= Israel at the 2010 Summer Youth Olympics =

- IOC code: ISR
- NOC: Olympic Committee of Israel
- Website: www.olympicsil.co.il (in Hebrew and English)

in Singapore
- Competitors: 15 in 8 sports
- Flag bearer: Naomi Cohen
- Medals Ranked 15th: Gold 3 Silver 2 Bronze 0 Total 5

Summer Youth Olympics appearances (overview)
- 2010; 2014; 2018; 2026

Israel competed at the 2010 Summer Youth Olympics in Singapore.

== Medalists ==
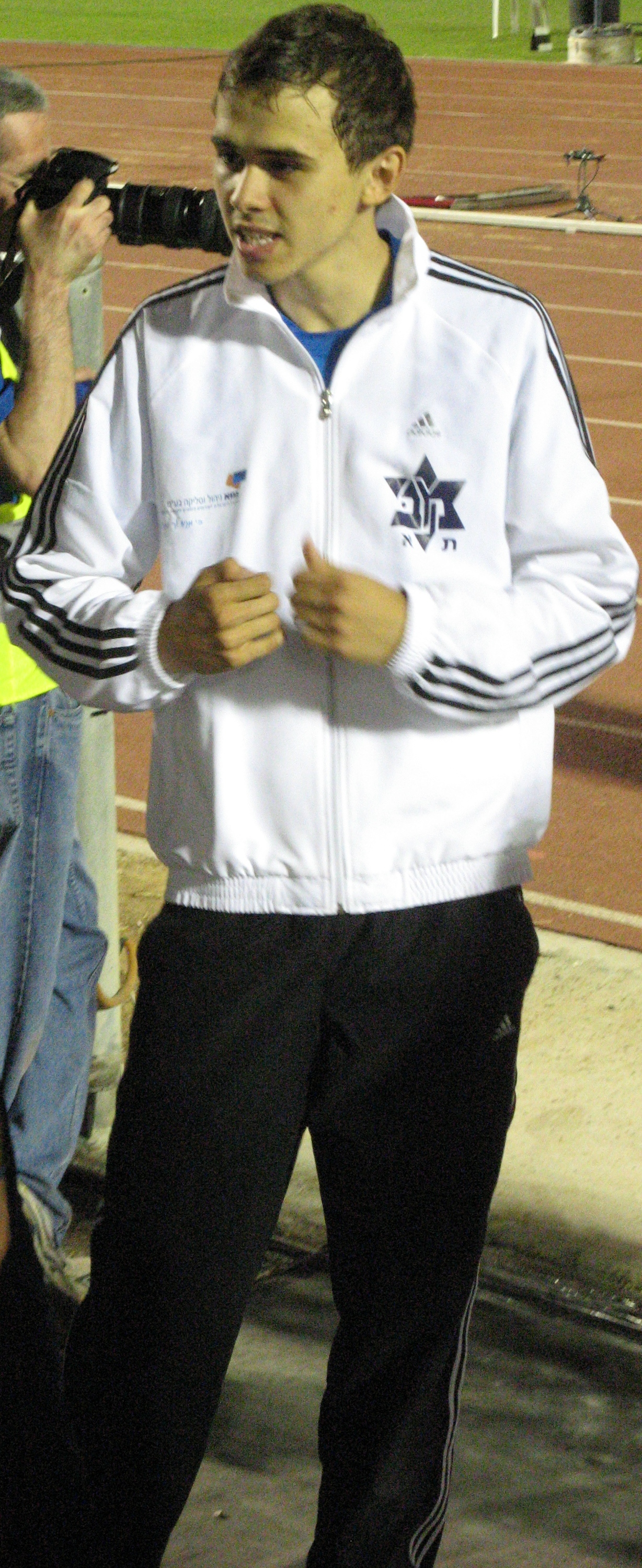
High jumper Dmitri Kroytor

Medal	Name	Sport	Event	Date
Gold	Gili Haimovitz	Taekwondo	Boys' 48 kg	15 Aug
Gold	Fanny Beisaron	Triathlon	Mixed relay (part of the mixed-NOC team Europe 1)	19 Aug
Gold	Dmitri Kroytor	Athletics	Boys' high jump	21 Aug
Gold	Mayan Rafic	Sailing	Boys' windsurfing (Techno 293)	25 Aug
Silver	Yakov Toumarkin	Swimming	Boys' 100m backstroke	16 Aug
Silver	Yakov Toumarkin	Swimming	Boys' 200m backstroke	20 Aug
Bronze	Rotem Shor	Judo	Mixed teams (part of the mixed-NOC team Tokyo)	25 Aug

== Athletics ==
Boys
Field events

Athletes	Event	Qualification		Final	
Athletes	Event	Result	Rank	Result	Rank
Dmitri Kroytor	Boys' High jump	2.07m	7 Q	2.19m	Gold medal

== Basketball ==
Boys

Squad list	Event	Group Stage		Placement Stage			Rank
Squad list	Event	Group C	Rank	1st-8th	5th-8th	5th-6th	Rank
Oleksander Chernuvych; Tom Maayan (C); Igor Mayor; Sergey Zelikman	Boys' basketball	United States; L 20–27	2 Q	Croatia; L 21-24	Argentina; W 33-22	Lithuania; L 24-28	6
Oleksander Chernuvych; Tom Maayan (C); Igor Mayor; Sergey Zelikman	Boys' basketball	Singapore; W 27–14	2 Q	Croatia; L 21-24	Argentina; W 33-22	Lithuania; L 24-28	6
Oleksander Chernuvych; Tom Maayan (C); Igor Mayor; Sergey Zelikman	Boys' basketball	Central African Republic; L 17-25	2 Q	Croatia; L 21-24	Argentina; W 33-22	Lithuania; L 24-28	6
Oleksander Chernuvych; Tom Maayan (C); Igor Mayor; Sergey Zelikman	Boys' basketball	Turkey; W 32-19	2 Q	Croatia; L 21-24	Argentina; W 33-22	Lithuania; L 24-28	6

== Gymnastics ==
=== Rhythmic gymnastics ===
Athlete	Event	Qualification						Final					
Athlete	Event	Rope	Hoop	Ball	Clubs	Total	Rank	Rope	Hoop	Ball	Clubs	Total	Rank
Victoria Veinberg Filanovsky	Girls' individual all-around	23.100	23.325	23.500	23.825	93.750	6 Q	23.150	23.300	23.000	23.400	92.850	6

== Judo ==
Girls

Athlete	Event	Round of 32	Round of 16	Quarterfinals	Semifinals	Final	Repechage			Rank
Athlete	Event	Round of 32	Round of 16	Quarterfinals	Semifinals	Final	Quarterfinals	Semifinals	Bronze final	Rank
Athlete	Event	Opposition Result	Opposition Result	Opposition Result	Opposition Result	Opposition Result	Opposition Result	Opposition Result	Opposition Result	Rank
Rotem Shor	Girls' -63 kg	Nemorin (MRI); W 020-000	Guillen (CRC); W 110-000	Tashiro (JPN); L 101-000	DNA		Nemorin (MRI); W 100-000	Incedayi (TUR); W 101-000	Naginskaite (LTU); L 100-000	5

Boys

Athlete	Event	Round of 16	Quarterfinals	Semifinals	Final	Repechage			Rank
Athlete	Event	Round of 16	Quarterfinals	Semifinals	Final	Quarterfinals	Semifinals	Bronze final	Rank
Athlete	Event	Opposition Result	Opposition Result	Opposition Result	Opposition Result	Opposition Result	Opposition Result	Opposition Result	Rank
Yakov Mamistalov	Boys' -100 kg	Glusac (SRB); W 100-000	Mendoza (CUB); L 001-000	DNA		Villalba (ARG); W 100-000	Glusac (SRB); L 100-000	DNA	7

Mixed event

Team	Event	Round 1		Round 2		Semifinals		Final		Rank
Team	Event	Personal	Team	Personal	Team	Personal	Team	Personal	Team	Rank
Team	Event	Opposition Result	Opposition Result	Opposition Result	Opposition Result	Opposition Result	Opposition Result	Opposition Result	Opposition Result	Rank
Tokyo; Seul Bi Bae (KOR); Fabio Basile (ITA); Gaelle Nemorin (MRI); Patrik Ferreira Martins (AND); Rotem Shor (ISR); Kevin Fernandez (HON); Kseniya Darchuk (UKR); Batuhan Efemgil (TUR)	Mixed team	Arrey (CMR); W 100-000	Paris; W 5-3	Incedayi (TUR); W 100-000	New York; W 4-4	Baxter (NZL); W 100-000	Paris; L 5-3	Did not advance		Bronze medal
Munich; Vita Valnova (BLR); Kęstutis Vitkauskas (LTU); Un Ju Ri (PRK); Beka Tugushi (GEO); Jalil Jalilov (AZE); Caren Chammas (LIB); Yacov Mamistvalov (ISR)	Mixed team	Mendoza (CUB); L 100-000 walkover	Essen; L 4-3	Did not advance						9

== Sailing ==
Athlete	Event	1	2	3	4	5	6	7	8	9	10	11	12	13	14	15	Medal race	Score	Rank
Mayan Rafic	Boys' Techno 293	5	1	2	1	2	4	1	1	1	(8)	Cancelled					4	22 (31)	Gold medal
Naomi Cohen	Girls' Techno 293	3	2	2	4	6	OCS (19)	2	8	6	5	Cancelled					8	46 (65)	4

- OCS – On the Course Side of the starting line

== Swimming ==
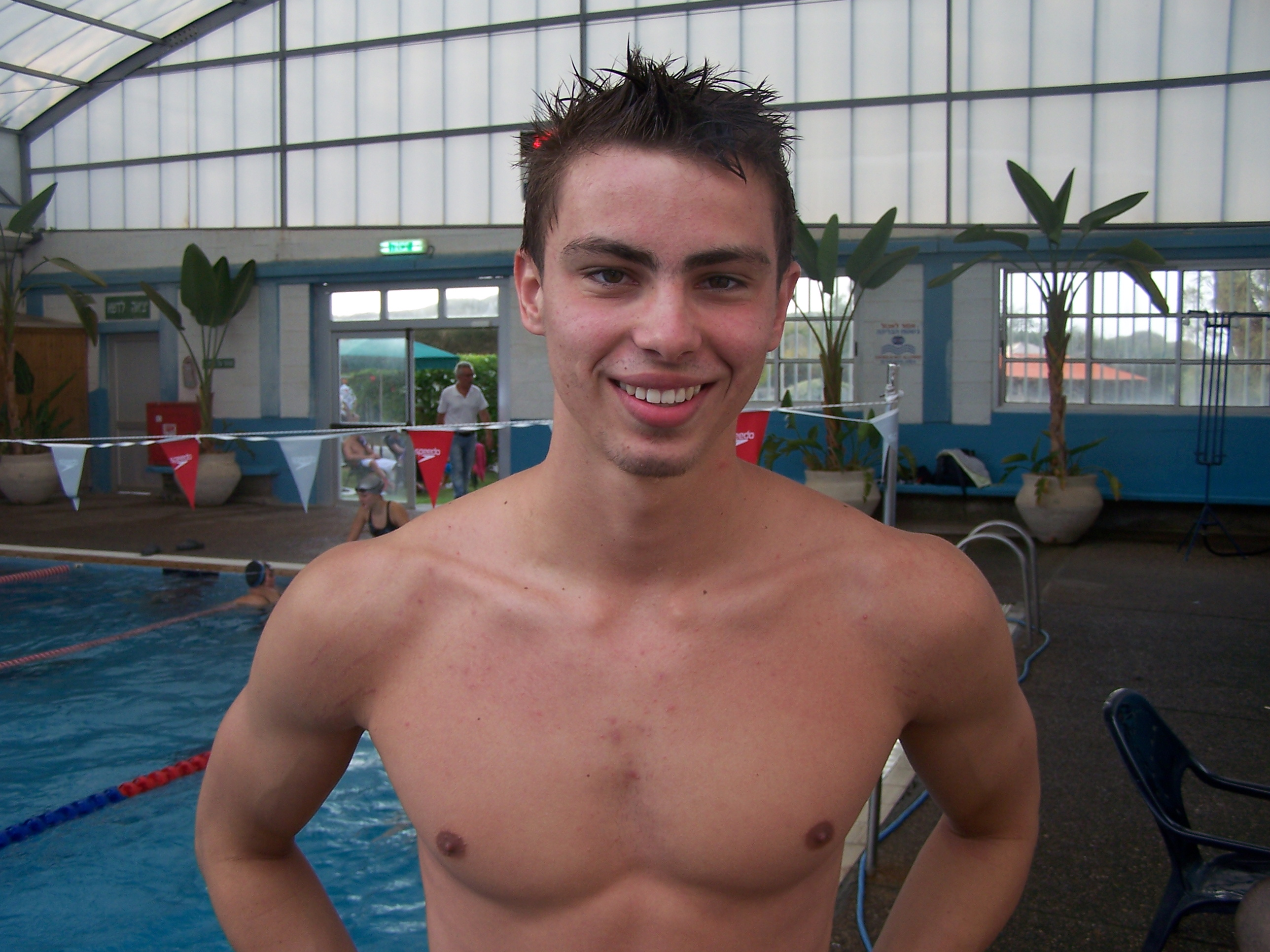
Swimmer Yakov Toumarkin

Girls

Athlete	Events	Heat		Semifinal		Final	
Athlete	Events	Time	Position	Time	Position	Time	Position
Nicol Samsonyk	50m freestyle	26.91	11 Q	27.01	15	DNA	
Nicol Samsonyk	100m freestyle	58.02	11 Q	58.19	14	DNA	

Boys

Athlete	Events	Heat		Semifinal		Final	
Athlete	Events	Time	Position	Time	Position	Time	Position
Yakov Toumarkin	100m backstroke	55.55	1 Q	55.40	1 Q	55.28	Silver medal
Yakov Toumarkin	200m backstroke	2:02.04	2 Q	—N/a		1:59.39	Silver medal
Yakov Toumarkin	200m individual medley	2:04.13	8 Q	—N/a		2:03.44	4
Imri Ganiel	50m breaststroke	29.52	7 Q	29.21	6 Q	29.45	6
Imri Ganiel	100m breaststroke	1:04.89	13 Q	1:04.27	7 Q	1:04.28	7

== Taekwondo ==
Boys

Athlete	Event	Quarterfinal	Semifinal	Final	Rank
Gili Haimovitz	48 kg	Barbosa (PHI); W 8–7	Guzman (ARG); W 5–4	Soleimani (IRI); W Walkover	Gold medal

== Triathlon ==
Girls

Athlete	Event	Swim (750 m)	Trans 1	Bike (20 km)	Trans 2	Run (5 km)	Total	Rank
Fanny Beisaron	Girls	9:58	0:40	31:41	0:26	19:22	1:02:07.29	6

Mixed

Athlete	Event	Total times per athlete (swim 250 m, bike 7 km, run 1.7 km)	Total group time	Rank
Eszter Dudas (HUN); Miguel Valente Gernandes (POR); Fanny Beisaron (ISR); Alois Knabl (AUT)	Mixed team relay Europe 1	20:46; 18.58; 21:11; 18:56	1:19:51.42	1st place, gold medalist(s)
