= Rowing at the 2010 Summer Youth Olympics – Girls' pair =

These are the results of the Junior Women's Pair event at the 2010 Summer Youth Olympics.

== Medalists ==
Gold	Silver	Bronze
Great Britain; Geordia Howard-Merrill; Fiona Gammond	Australia; Emma Basher; Olympia Aldersey	Greece; Eleni Diamanti; Lydia Ntalamagka

== Schedule ==
All times are China Standard Time (UTC+8)

Date	Time	Round
Sunday, August 15, 2010	11:20-11:50	Heats
Monday, August 16, 2010	11:20-11:30	Repechage
Tuesday, August 17, 2010	11:20-11:40	Semifinals A/B
Wednesday, August 18, 2010	11:00-11:10	Final B
Wednesday, August 18, 2010	11:40-11:50	Final A

== Results ==
=== Heats ===
- Qualification Rules: 1-3->SA/B, 4..->R

==== Heat 1 ====
August 15, 12:00

Rank	Athlete	Country	Time	Notes
1	Ana Gigica, Madalina Buzdugan	Romania	3:35.80	Q - SA/B
2	Szimona Uglik, Hella Kiss	Hungary	3:40.12	Q - SA/B
3	Elizaveta Tikhanova, Anastasia Tikhanova	Russia	3:43.98	Q - SA/B
4	Nimmy Thomas, Mitali Sekhar Deo	India	3:49.69	R
5	Varaporn Monchai, Anita Mindra Whiskin	Thailand	4:00.25	R

==== Heat 2 ====
August 15, 11:40

Rank	Athlete	Country	Time	Notes
1	Emma Basher, Olympia Aldersey	Australia	3:30.09	Q - SA/B
2	Teodora Gesheva, Petya Mavrova	Bulgaria	3:37.09	Q - SA/B
3	Tanya Misachenka, Nadzeya Misachenka	Belarus	3:44.51	Q - SA/B
4	Akane Makamu, Juliet Donaldson	South Africa	3:49.14	R

==== Heat 3 ====
August 15, 11:50

Rank	Athlete	Country	Time	Notes
1	Georgia Howard-Merrill, Fiona Gammond	Great Britain	3:30.92	Q - SA/B
2	Eleni Diamanti, Lydia Ntalamagka	Greece	3:31.50	Q - SA/B
3	Elena Coletti, Giada Colombo	Italy	3:32.85	Q - SA/B
4	Beatrix Heaphy-Hall, Eve Macfarlane	New Zealand	3:34.85	R

=== Repechage ===
- Qualification Rules: 1-3->SA/B, 4..->out

August 16, 11:55

Rank	Athlete	Country	Time	Notes
1	Beatrix Heaphy-Hall, Eve Macfarlane	New Zealand	3:49.63	Q - SA/B
2	Nimmy Thomas, Mitali Sekhar Deo	India	4:00.27	Q - SA/B
3	Akane Makamu, Juliet Donaldson	South Africa	4:03.86	Q - SA/B
4	Varaporn Monchai, Anita Mindra Whiskin	Thailand	4:08.87	E

=== Semifinals A/B ===
- Qualification Rules: 1-3->FA, 4..->FB

==== Semifinal A/B 1 ====
August 17, 11:20

Rank	Athlete	Country	Time	Notes
1	Elena Coletti, Giada Colombo	Italy	3:37.29	Q - FA
2	Ana Gigica, Madalina Buzdugan	Romania	3:40.67	Q - FA
3	Georgia Howard-Merrill, Fiona Gammond	Great Britain	3:41.03	Q - FA
4	Teodora Gesheva, Petya Mavrova	Bulgaria	3:41.18	FB
5	Beatrix Heaphy-Hall, Eve Macfarlane	New Zealand	3:41.97	FB
6	Nimmy Thomas, Mitali Sekhar Deo	India	4:02.77	FB

==== Semifinal A/B 2 ====
August 17, 11:30

Rank	Athlete	Country	Time	Notes
1	Emma Basher, Olympia Aldersey	Australia	3:36.83	Q - FA
2	Eleni Diamanti, Lydia Ntalamagka	Greece	3:38.11	Q - FA
3	Szimona Uglik, Hella Kiss	Hungary	3:46.22	Q - FA
4	Tanya Misachenka, Nadzeya Misachenka	Belarus	3:50.77	FB
5	Elizaveta Tikhanova, Anastasia Tikhanova	Russia	3:51.46	FB
6	Akane Makamu, Juliet Donaldson	South Africa	4:00.80	FB

=== Finals ===
==== Final B ====
August 18, 11:00

Rank	Athlete	Country	Time	Notes
1	Beatrix Heaphy-Hall, Eve Macfarlane	New Zealand	3:38.69	
2	Elizaveta Tikhanova, Anastasia Tikhanova	Russia	3:42.14	
3	Tanya Misachenka, Nadzeya Misachenka	Belarus	3:42.29	
4	Teodora Gesheva, Petya Mavrova	Bulgaria	3:46.59	
5	Nimmy Thomas, Mitali Sekhar Deo	India	3:50.92	
6	Akane Makamu, Juliet Donaldson	South Africa	3:51.35	

==== Final A ====
August 18, 11:50

Rank	Athlete	Country	Time	Notes
1st place, gold medalist(s)	Georgia Howard-Merrill, Fiona Gammond	Great Britain	3:28.60	
2nd place, silver medalist(s)	Emma Basher, Olympia Aldersey	Australia	3:29.34	
3rd place, bronze medalist(s)	Eleni Diamanti, Lydia Ntalamagka	Greece	3:29.37	
4	Elena Coletti, Giada Colombo	Italy	3:30.05	
5	Ana Gigica, Madalina Buzdugan	Romania	3:37.32	
6	Szimona Uglik, Hella Kiss	Hungary	3:40.58	
