= Athletics at the 2017 Summer Universiade – Men's high jump =

The men's high jump event at the 2017 Summer Universiade was held on 23 and 25 August in Taipei City.

== Medalists ==
Gold	Silver	Bronze
Falk Wendrich; Germany	Marco Fassinotti; Italy	Hsiang Chun-hsien; Chinese Taipei

== Results ==
=== Qualification ===
Qualification: 2.23 m (Q) or at least 12 best (q) qualified for the final.

Rank	Group	Athlete	Nationality	1.85	1.95	2.05	2.10	2.15	Result	Notes
1	A	Marco Fassinotti	Italy	–	–	–	o	o	2.15	q
1	A	Carlos Layoy	Argentina	–	–	o	o	o	2.15	q
1	A	Falk Wendrich	Germany	–	–	–	o	o	2.15	q
1	B	Norbert Kobielski	Poland	–	–	o	o	o	2.15	q
1	B	Dmitry Kroytor	Israel	–	–	o	o	o	2.15	q
1	B	Allan Smith	Great Britain	–	–	o	o	o	2.15	q
1	B	Woo Sang-hyeok	South Korea	–	–	–	o	o	2.15	q
8	B	Hsiang Chun-hsien	Chinese Taipei	–	–	–	xo	o	2.15	q
9	B	Adrijus Glebauskas	Lithuania	–	–	o	xo	xo	2.15	q
10	A	Mpho Links	South Africa	–	–	xo	xo	xo	2.15	q
11	A	Tzur Liberman	Israel	–	o	o	o	xxo	2.15	q
12	A	Roman Loshkarev	Kazakhstan	–	–	xxo	o	xxo	2.15	q
13	A	Hamish Kerr	New Zealand	–	o	o	o	xxx	2.10	
14	A	Paulo Conceição	Portugal	–	–	xo	o	xxx	2.10	
14	B	Joseph Baldwin	Australia	–	o	xo	o	xxx	2.10	
16	A	Dan Claudiu Lazarica	Romania	–	–	o	xo	xxx	2.10	
17	B	Eugenio Meloni	Italy	–	–	o	xxo	xxx	2.10	
18	B	Sean Cate	Canada	–	–	xo	xxo	xxx	2.10	
19	B	Marcel Mayack II	Cameroon	–	–	o	xxx		2.05	
19	B	Kevin Rutare	Luxembourg	–	–	o	xxx		2.05	
21	A	Kristjan Tafenau	Estonia	–	o	xxo	xxx		2.05	
22	A	Husniddin Zaripov	Tajikistan	–	xo	xxo	xxx		2.05	
	B	Norshafiee Mohd Shah	Malaysia	–	xxx				NM	
	A	Hussein Al-Ibraheemi	Iraq						DNS	
	A	Abass Turay	Sierra Leone						DNS	

=== Final ===
Official Video

Rank	Athlete	Nationality	2.05	2.10	2.15	2.20	2.23	2.26	2.29	2.31	Result	Notes
1st place, gold medalist(s)	Falk Wendrich	Germany	–	o	o	o	o	o	xxo	xxx	2.29	PB
2nd place, silver medalist(s)	Marco Fassinotti	Italy	–	xo	o	o	o	xxo	xxo	xxx	2.29	SB
3rd place, bronze medalist(s)	Hsiang Chun-hsien	Chinese Taipei	–	–	o	o	–	o	xxx		2.26	SB
4	Allan Smith	Great Britain	–	–	o	o	xo	xxx			2.23	
5	Adrijus Glebauskas	Lithuania	–	o	o	xxo	xo	xxx			2.23	PB
6	Dmitry Kroytor	Israel	–	o	o	o	xxo	xx–	x		2.23	SB
7	Mpho Links	South Africa	–	xo	o	xxo	xxo	xxx			2.23	=PB
8	Woo Sang-hyeok	South Korea	–	o	xo	o	xxx				2.20	
9	Carlos Layoy	Argentina	–	xo	xo	o	xxx				2.20	SB
10	Norbert Kobielski	Poland	o	o	o	xxx					2.15	
10	Tzur Liberman	Israel	o	o	o	xx–	x				2.15	
12	Roman Loshkarev	Kazakhstan	xo	o	xo	xxx					2.15	
