= Greece at the 2010 Summer Youth Olympics =

- IOC code: GRE
- NOC: Hellenic Olympic Committee
- Website: www.hoc.gr

in Singapore
- Competitors: 28 in 9 sports
- Flag bearer: Michalis Nastopoulos
- Medals Ranked 67th: Gold 0 Silver 2 Bronze 3 Total 5

Summer Youth Olympics appearances
- 2010; 2014; 2018

Greece participated in the 2010 Summer Youth Olympics in Singapore.

The Greek team consisted of 28 athletes competing in 9 sports: archery, athletics, basketball, boxing, gymnastics, judo, rowing, sailing and swimming.

As the originator of the Olympic Games, the Greek flag entered the stadium first during the opening ceremony.

== Medalists ==
Medal	Name	Sport	Event	Date
Silver	Michalis Nastopoulos; Apostolos Lampridis	Rowing	Boys' Pair	18 Aug
Silver	Zoi Paraskevopoulou	Archery	Mixed Team (part of the mixed-NOC team)	19 Aug
Bronze	Eleni Diamanti; Lydia Ntalamagka	Rowing	Girls' Pair	18 Aug
Bronze	Theodoros Chrysanthopoulos	Athletics	Boys' Pole Vault	23 Aug
Bronze	Theodoros Tsiloulis; Spyridon Panagiotaras; Lampros Vlachos; Emmanuel Tselentakis	Basketball	Boys' Tournament	23 Aug

== Archery ==
Girls

Athlete	Event	Ranking Round		Round of 32	Round of 16	Quarterfinals	Semifinals	Final	
Athlete	Event	Score	Seed	Opposition Score	Opposition Score	Opposition Score	Opposition Score	Opposition Score	Rank
Zoi Paraskevopoulou	Girls’ Individual	551	26	Sichenikova (UKR); L 0-6	Did not advance				17

Mixed Team

Athlete	Event	Round of 32	Round of 16	Quarterfinals	Semifinals	Final	
Athlete	Event	Opposition Score	Opposition Score	Opposition Score	Opposition Score	Opposition Score	Rank
Zoi Paraskevopoulou (GRE); Gregor Rajh (SLO)	Mixed Team	Tukebayeva (KAZ); Todorov (BUL); W 6 - 2	Custers (NED); Shahnazary (ARM); W 6 - 4	Song (CHN); Pianesi (ITA); W 6 - 4	Alarcón (ESP); Milon (BAN); W 7 - 1	Filippi (ITA); Karoukin (BLR); L 3 - 7	Silver medal

== Athletics ==
- 10 Greek athletes will participate in Athletic event.

=== Boys ===
Field Events

Athletes	Event	Qualification		Final	
Athletes	Event	Result	Rank	Result	Rank
Dimitrios Senikidis	Boys’ Shot Put	18.43	10 qB	18.50	10
Petros Evangelakos	Boys’ Discus Throw	54.57	8 Q	58.37	4
Nektarios Fylladitakis	Boys’ Hammer Throw	68.67	7 Q	57.59	8
Nikolaos Tsiokos	Boys’ Triple Jump	14.80	9 qB	14.80	10
Theodoros Chrysanthopoulos	Boys’ Pole Vault	4.70	2 Q	4.95	Bronze medal

=== Girls ===
Track and Road Events

Athletes	Event	Qualification		Final	
Athletes	Event	Result	Rank	Result	Rank
Aikaterini Berdousi	Girls’ 3000m	9:44.73	5 Q	9:37.56	4
Aikaterini Theodoropoulou	Girls’ 5km Walk			23:44.38	10

Field Events

Athletes	Event	Qualification		Final	
Athletes	Event	Result	Rank	Result	Rank
Evangelia Psaraki	Girls’ Discus Throw	45.00	6 Q	44.64	6
Agapi Proskynitopoulou	Girls’ Hammer Throw	56.60	5 Q	48.76	9
Alexandra Zagora	Girls’ high jump	1.76	5 Q	1.75	7

== Basketball ==
Boys

Squad List	Event	Group Stage		Placement Stage			Rank
Squad List	Event	Group A	Rank	1st-8th	1st-4th	3rd-4th	Rank
Theodoros Tsiloulis; Spyridon Panagiotaras (C); Lampros Vlachos; Emmanuel Tselentakis	Boys' Basketball	New Zealand; W 22-19	2	Argentina; W 25-24	Croatia; L 30-33	United States; W 34-25	Bronze medal
Theodoros Tsiloulis; Spyridon Panagiotaras (C); Lampros Vlachos; Emmanuel Tselentakis	Boys' Basketball	Puerto Rico; W 23-21	2	Argentina; W 25-24	Croatia; L 30-33	United States; W 34-25	Bronze medal
Theodoros Tsiloulis; Spyridon Panagiotaras (C); Lampros Vlachos; Emmanuel Tselentakis	Boys' Basketball	Serbia; L 14-34	2	Argentina; W 25-24	Croatia; L 30-33	United States; W 34-25	Bronze medal
Theodoros Tsiloulis; Spyridon Panagiotaras (C); Lampros Vlachos; Emmanuel Tselentakis	Boys' Basketball	India; W 33-20	2	Argentina; W 25-24	Croatia; L 30-33	United States; W 34-25	Bronze medal

== Boxing ==
Boys

Athlete	Event	Preliminaries	Semifinals	Final	Rank
Alexios Zarntiasvili	Super Heavyweight (+91kg)	Daniil Svaresciuc (MDA); L 4-6	Did not advance	5th Place Bout; Oleksandr Skoryi (UKR); L wd	6

== Gymnastics ==
=== Artistic Gymnastics ===
Boys

Athlete	Event	Floor		Pommel Horse		Rings		Vault		Parallel Bars		Horizontal Bar		Total	
Athlete	Event	Score	Rank	Score	Rank	Score	Rank	Score	Rank	Score	Rank	Score	Rank	Score	Rank
Nikolaos Iliopoulos	Boys' Qualification	12.400	36	13.700	4 Q	13.850	12	15.400	15	13.350	18	13.500	13	82.200	12 Q
Nikolaos Iliopoulos	Boys' Individual All-Around	11.950	18	13.350	7	13.900	6	14.900	11	13.850	7	13.450	10	81.400	12

Athlete	Event	Score	Rank
Nikolaos Iliopoulos	Boys' Pommel Horse	13.200	7

Girls

Athlete	Event	Vault		Uneven Bars		Beam		Floor		Total	
Athlete	Event	Score	Rank	Score	Rank	Score	Rank	Score	Rank	Score	Rank
Elisavet Tsakou	Girls' Qualification	12.950	28	12.750	11	12.550	24	11.950	27	50.200	21

=== Trampoline ===
Athlete	Event	Qualification				Final	
Athlete	Event	Routine 1	Routine 2	Total	Rank	Routine 1	Rank
Apostolos Koutavas	Boys' Trampoline	28.000	35.100	63.100	7 Q	39.200	4

== Judo ==
Individual

Athlete	Event	Round 1	Round 2	Round 3	Semifinals	Final	Rank
Athlete	Event	Opposition Result	Opposition Result	Opposition Result	Opposition Result	Opposition Result	Rank
Alexios Ntanatsidis	Boys' -81 kg	Lim (SIN); W 100-000	Efemgil (TUR); W 011-010		Lee (KOR); L 000-111	Bronze Medal Match; Szakacs (SVK); L 000-011	5

Team

Team	Event	Round 1	Round 2	Semifinals	Final	Rank
Team	Event	Opposition Result	Opposition Result	Opposition Result	Opposition Result	Rank
Osaka; Sothea Sam (CAM); Abdulrahman Anter (YEM); Jing Fang Tang (SIN); Brandon Arends (ARU); Laura Naginskaite (LTU); Alexios Ntanatsidis (GRE); Natalia Kubin (GER); Bruno Abel Villalba (ARG)	Mixed Team	Barcelona; W 5-3	Belgrade; L 4-4 (1-3)	Did not advance		5

== Rowing ==
Athlete	Event	Heats		Repechage		Semifinals		Final		Overall Rank
Athlete	Event	Time	Rank	Time	Rank	Time	Rank	Time	Rank	Overall Rank
Michalis Nastopoulos; Apostolos Lampridis	Boys' Pair	3:08.28	1 QA/B			3:15.02	1 QA	3:06.85	2	Silver medal
Eleni Diamanti; Lydia Ntalamagka	Girls' Pair	3:31.50	2 QA/B			3:38.11	2 QA	3:29.37	3	Bronze medal

== Sailing ==
Windsurfing

Athlete	Event	Race											Points	Rank
Athlete	Event	1	2	3	4	5	6	7	8	9	10	M*	Points	Rank
Efstratios Doukas	Boys' Techno 293	19	21	20	19	16	21	18	19	~~DNF~~	20	20	193	21

== Swimming ==
Athletes	Event	Heat		Semifinal		Final	
Athletes	Event	Time	Position	Time	Position	Time	Position
Ioannis Karpouzlis	Boys’ 50m Breaststroke	29.17	5 Q	29.04	4 Q	29.05	5
Ioannis Karpouzlis	Boys’ 100m Breaststroke	1:04.71	10 Q	1:04.90	13	Did not advance	
Panagiotis Samilidis	Boys’ 100m Breaststroke	1:04.57	9 Q	1:03.26	5 Q	1:03.08	4
Panagiotis Samilidis	Boys’ 200m Breaststroke	2:19.15	8 Q			2:17.36	5
Panagiotis Samilidis	Boys’ 200m Individual Medley	DNS				Did not advance	
Maria Georgia Michalaka	Girls’ 50m Breaststroke	33.40	12 Q	32.96	7 Q	32.90	6
Maria Georgia Michalaka	Girls’ 100m Breaststroke	1:10.77	3 Q	1:10.55	4 Q	1:10.41	5
Maria Georgia Michalaka	Girls’ 200m breaststroke	2:37.11	9			Did not advance	
