= Sailing at the 2010 Summer Youth Olympics =

Sailing at the I Summer Youth Olympic Games
- Venue: National Sailing Centre
- Dates: 17 – 25 August 2010
- No. of events: 4 (2 boys, 2 girls)
- Competitors: 100 (50 boys, 50 girls) from 60 nations

Sailing at the 2010 Summer Youth Olympics in Singapore took place between 17 and 25 August. The sailing competition comprised four medal events with Boys and Girls sailing in either the Byte CII boat (one person dinghy) or Techno 293 (windsurfing).

== One Person Dinghy ==
=== Boys ===
Name	Country
Saif Ibrahim Al-Hammadi	United Arab Emirates
Eduardo Ariza	Dominican Republic
Pavlo Babych	Ukraine
Ian Barrows	United States Virgin Islands
Péter Bathó	Hungary
Marco Benini	Italy
Juan Ignacio Biava	Argentina
Darren Wong Loong Choy	Singapore
Jack Collinson	New Zealand
Anis Elmjid	Tunisia
Alexander "Catatau" Elstrodt	Brazil
Harald Fæste	Norway
Florian Haufe	Germany
Lester Luis Hernández	Cuba
Marti Llena	Spain
Massimo Mazzolini	Monaco
Muhamad Amirul Shafiq Md Jais	Malaysia
Valerij Ovcinnikov	Lithuania
Gonçalo Pires	Portugal
Supakon Pongwichean	Thailand
Alp Rodopman	Turkey
Sébastian Schneiter	Switzerland
Owen Siese	Bermuda
Mark Spearman	Australia
Kaarle Tapper	Finland
Aquila Tatira	Cook Islands
Just van Aanholt	Netherlands Antilles
Wang Zhi	China
Žan Luka Zelko	Slovenia

=== Girls ===
Name	Country
Irene Abascal	Guatemala
Elise Beavis	New Zealand
Niki Blassar	Finland
Céline Carlsen	Denmark
Sanlay Castro	Cuba
Catherine Diaz	United States Virgin Islands
Sarah Douglas	Canada
Paloma Esteban	Dominican Republic
Lara Kiran Granier	Kenya
Gu Min	China
Lamia Feriel Hammiche	Algeria
Pinar Kaynar	Turkey
Madison Kennedy	Australia
Sofiia Larycheva	Ukraine
Stephanie Lovell	Saint Lucia
Claudia Mazzaferro	Brazil
Teau Moana McKenszie	Cook Islands
Khairunneeta Mohd Affendy	Malaysia
Sophie Murphy	Ireland
Eva Peternelj	Slovenia
Sara Piasecka	Poland
Maria Poncell	Chile
Alexandra Rayroux	Switzerland
Tu´lemanu Ripley	American Samoa
Matilde Simoncini	San Marino
Inês Sobral	Portugal
Constanze Stolz	Germany
Lara Vadlau	Austria
Daphne van der Vaart	Netherlands
Nicole van der Velden	Aruba
Elizabeth Wauchope	Cayman Islands
Natasha Michiko Yokoyama	Singapore

== Windsurfing ==
=== Boys ===
Name	Country
Kiran Badloe	Netherlands
Daniele Benedetti	Italy
Omar Noureddine Bouabdallah	Algeria
Matías Canseco	Peru
Cheng Chun Leung Michael	Hong Kong
José Dávila	Mexico
Efstratios Doukas	Greece
Ronalds Kaups	Latvia
Kim Chan-eui	South Korea
Daiya Kuramochi	Japan
Maxime Labat	France
Juan Lejarraga	Guatemala
Kieran Martin	United Kingdom
Alejandro Luis Monllor	Puerto Rico
Artem Murashev	Russia
András Nikl	Hungary
Robert Pellowski	Poland
Mayan Rafic	Israel
Nikita Rom	Estonia
Bautista Saubidet Birkner	Argentina
Ian Stokes	United States

=== Girls ===
Name	Country
Valentina Serigós	Argentina
Andrea Vanhoorne	Belgium
Anastasiya Yalkevich	Belarus
Wendy Richer Soares	Brazil
Audrey Caron	Canada
Clidane Humeau	France
Man Ka Kei	Hong Kong
Naomi Cohen	Israel
Veronica Fanciulli	Italy
Shiori Yuri	Japan
Diana Valera	Mexico
Josefina Roder	Peru
Hanna Idziak	Poland
Audrey Pei Lin Yong	Singapore
Lara Lagoa	Spain
Siripon Kaewduang-Ngam	Thailand
Jade Rogers	United Kingdom
Margot Samson	United States

== Competition schedule ==
Event date	Event day	Starting time	Event details
25 August	Wednesday	12:00	Girls' Byte CII
25 August	Wednesday	12:00	Girls' Techno 293
25 August	Wednesday	12:05	Boys' Byte CII
25 August	Wednesday	12:05	Boys' Techno 293

== Results ==
=== Boys ===
Games	Gold	Silver	Bronze
One Person Dinghy (Byte CII)	Ian Barrows (ISV)	Florian Haufe (GER)	Just Van Aanholt (AHO)
Windsurfing (Techno 293)	Mayan Rafic (ISR)	Chun Leung Michael Cheng (HKG)	Kieran Martin (GBR)

=== Girls ===
Games	Gold	Silver	Bronze
One Person Dinghy (Byte CII)	Lara Vadlau (AUT)	Daphne van der Vaart (NED)	Constanze Stolz (GER)
Windsurfing (Techno 293)	Siripon Kaewduang-Ngam (THA)	Veronica Fanciulli (ITA)	Audrey Pei Lin Yong (SIN)
