= Rowing at the 2010 Summer Youth Olympics =

Rowing at the I Summer Youth Olympic Games
- Venue: Marina Reservoir
- Dates: 15 – 18 August 2010
- No. of events: 4 (2 boys, 2 girls)
- Competitors: 70 (35 boys, 35 girls) from 44 nations

Rowing at the 2010 Summer Youth Olympics in Singapore took place at the Marina Reservoir between 15 and 18 August. There were races over a straight course over 1000m.

== Competition schedule ==
Date	Round
Sunday 15 August 2010	Heats
Monday 16 August 2010	Repechages
Tuesday 17 August 2010	Semifinals
Wednesday 18 August 2010	Finals

=== Finals ===
All times are China Standard Time (UTC+8)

Event date	Event day	Starting time	Event details
18 August	Wednesday	11:20	Girls' Single Sculls
18 August	Wednesday	11:30	Boys' Single Sculls
18 August	Wednesday	11:40	Girls' Pair
18 August	Wednesday	11:50	Boys' Pair

== Medal summary ==
=== Medal table ===
Rank	Nation	Gold	Silver	Bronze	Total
1	Germany (GER)	1	1	0	2
2	Great Britain (GBR)	1	0	0	1
2	Lithuania (LTU)	1	0	0	1
2	Slovenia (SLO)	1	0	0	1
5	Australia (AUS)	0	1	1	2
5	Greece (GRE)	0	1	1	2
7	Ukraine (UKR)	0	1	0	1
8	France (FRA)	0	0	1	1
8	Romania (ROU)	0	0	1	1
Totals (9 entries)		4	4	4	12

=== Events ===
==== Boys' Events ====
Games	Gold	Silver	Bronze
Boys' Single Sculls	Rolandas Maščinskas (LTU)	Felix Bach (GER)	Ioan Prundeanu (ROU)
Boys' Pair	Slovenia; Jure Grace; Grega Domanjko	Greece; Michalis Nastopoulos; Apostolos Lampridis	Australia; Matthew Chochran; David Watts

==== Girls' Events ====
Games	Gold	Silver	Bronze
Girls' Single Sculls	Judith Sievers (GER)	Nataliia Kovalova (UKR)	Noémie Kober (FRA)
Girls' Pair	Great Britain; Georgia Howard-Merrill; Fiona Gammond	Australia; Emma Basher; Olympia Aldersey	Greece; Eleni Diamanti; Lydia Ntalamagka
