= Taekwondo at the Summer Youth Olympics =

Taekwondo competition

- Governing body: WTF
- Events: 10 (men: 5; women: 5)

Games
- 2010; 2014; 2018; 2026

Taekwondo was inducted at the Youth Olympic Games at the inaugural edition in 2010.

== Summary ==
Games	Year	Events	Best Nation
1	2010	10	South Korea
2	2014	10	Chinese Taipei
3	2018	10	Russia
4	2026	11	Jordan

== Medal table ==
As of the 2026 Summer Youth Olympics.

Rank	Nation	Gold	Silver	Bronze	Total
1	Iran	7	3	1	11
2	Russia	5	3	3	11
2	South Korea	5	3	3	11
4	Chinese Taipei	3	2	2	7
5	Jordan	3	1	2	6
6	Thailand	3	1	0	4
7	China	2	0	6	8
8	Croatia	2	0	1	3
9	Germany	1	3	2	6
10	Azerbaijan	1	2	1	4
11	France	1	1	4	6
12	United States	1	1	3	5
13	Morocco	1	1	1	3
14	Serbia	1	1	0	2
15	Egypt	1	0	2	3
15	Great Britain	1	0	2	3
15	Senegal	1	0	2	3
18	Brazil	1	0	1	2
19	Israel	1	0	0	1
20	Mexico	0	3	7	10
21	Uzbekistan	0	3	0	3
22	Turkey	0	2	5	7
23	Belgium	0	2	2	4
23	Ukraine	0	2	2	4
25	Spain	0	1	2	3
26	Kazakhstan	0	1	1	2
26	Tunisia	0	1	1	2
26	Vietnam	0	1	1	2
29	Australia	0	1	0	1
29	Czech Republic	0	1	0	1
29	Portugal	0	1	0	1
32	Canada	0	0	3	3
32	Italy	0	0	3	3
32	Niger	0	0	3	3
35	Singapore	0	0	2	2
36	Afghanistan	0	0	1	1
36	Argentina	0	0	1	1
36	Bolivia	0	0	1	1
36	Colombia	0	0	1	1
36	Cuba	0	0	1	1
36	Cyprus	0	0	1	1
36	Ecuador	0	0	1	1
36	Greece	0	0	1	1
36	Lebanon	0	0	1	1
36	Moldova	0	0	1	1
36	Netherlands	0	0	1	1
36	Sweden	0	0	1	1
36	Tajikistan	0	0	1	1
Totals (48 entries)		41	41	81	163

== See also ==
- Taekwondo at the Summer Olympics
