= Athletics at the 2010 Summer Youth Olympics – Girls' high jump =

Athletics – girls' high jump at the I Summer Youth Olympic Games
- Venue: Bishan Stadium
- Date: August 18–22
- Competitors: 14 from 14 nations

Medalists
1st place, gold medalist(s)		Mariya Kuchina	Russia
2nd place, silver medalist(s)		Alessia Trost	Italy
3rd place, bronze medalist(s)		Aneta Rydz	Poland

The girls' high jump event at the 2010 Summer Youth Olympics was held on 18–22 August 2010 in Bishan Stadium.

== Schedule ==
Date	Time	Round
18 August 2010	09:25	Qualification
22 August 2010	09:10	Final

== Results ==
=== Qualification ===
The top 8 jumpers qualified to the A Final, while the other jumpers competed in the B Final.

Rank	Athlete	1.65	1.70	1.73	1.76	Result	Notes
1	Mariya Kuchina (RUS)	o	o	o	o	1.76	
1	Betsabe Paez (ARG)	o	o	o	o	1.76	
1	Aneta Rydz (POL)	o	o	o	o	1.76	=SB
1	Alessia Trost (ITA)	o	o	-	o	1.76	
5	Alezandra Zagora (GRE)	o	xo	o	xo	1.76	PB
6	Leontia Kallenou (CYP)	o	o	o	xxo	1.76	
6	Galina Nikolova (BUL)	o	o	o	xxo	1.76	=PB
8	Basant Ibrahim (EGY)	o	o	o	xxx	1.73	
9	Melina Brenner (GER)	o	o	o	xxx	1.73	
10	Priscilla Shlegel (ESP)	o	o	xo	xxx	1.73	
11	Reka Czuth (HUN)	o	o	xxx		1.70	
11	Meng-Chia Wu (TPE)	o	o	x-	xxx	1.70	
13	Wai Yee Fung (HKG)	o	xxo	-	xxx	1.70	
	Shanice Hall (JAM)	xxx				NM	

=== Finals ===
==== B Final ====
Rank	Athlete	1.60	1.65	1.69	1.72	1.75	1.78	1.81	Result	Notes
1	Meng-Chia Wu (TPE)	-	o	xo	o	o	xxo	xxx	1.78	=SB
2	Melina Brenner (GER)	-	o	xo	o	o	xxx		1.75	
3	Reka Czuth (HUN)	o	o	o	xo	xxx			1.72	
4	Priscilla Shlegel (ESP)	o	o	xo	xxo	xxx			1.72	
5	Wai Yee Fung (HKG)	o	o	xxx					1.65	
	Shanice Hall (JAM)	-							DNS	

==== A Final ====
Rank	Athlete	1.70	1.75	1.79	1.83	1.86	1.89	1.92	Result	Notes
1st place, gold medalist(s)	Mariya Kuchina (RUS)	o	o	o	xxo	o	o	xxx	1.89	
2nd place, silver medalist(s)	Alessia Trost (ITA)	-	o	o	o	o	xx-	x	1.86	
3rd place, bronze medalist(s)	Aneta Rydz (POL)	o	o	o	xxx				1.79	PB
4	Leontia Kallenou (CYP)	o	o	xo	xxx				1.79	
4	Galina Nikolova (BUL)	o	o	xo	xxx				1.79	PB
6	Betsabe Paez (ARG)	o	o	xxo	xxx				1.79	
7	Alexandra Zagora (GRE)	xo	o	xxx					1.75	
8	Basant Ibrahim (EGY)	o	xxx						1.70	
