= Olympia Aldersey =

Australian rower (born 1992)

Personal information
- Born: 26 July 1992 (age 33) Rose Park, South Australia, Australia
- Home town: Adelaide, South Australia, Australia
- Height: 1.83 m (6 ft 0 in)
- Weight: 75 kg (165 lb)

Sport
- Country: Australia
- Sport: Rowing
- Club: Adelaide Rowing Club
- Coached by: Tom Westgarth

Achievements and titles
- Olympic finals: Tokyo 2020 W8+
Medal record
Women's rowing
Representing Australia
World Championships
Gold medal – first place	2019 Ottensheim	Coxless four
Bronze medal – third place	2014 Amsterdam	Double sculls
Bronze medal – third place	2017 Sarasota	Double sculls
Bronze medal – third place	2023 Belgrade	Eight
World Championships (U23)
Gold medal – first place	2012 Trakai	Quadruple sculls
Youth Olympic Games
Silver medal – second place	2010 Singapore	Coxless pair
World Championships (junior)
Bronze medal – third place	2010 Račice	Coxless four

Olympia Aldersey (born 26 July 1992) is a retired Australian rower. She is an Australian national champion, a dual Olympian and was a 2019 World Champion in the coxless four. In 2014 she set a world's fastest ever time (6:37.31) in a women's double scull over 2000m, a record which has stood since. She rowed in the Australian women's eight at the Tokyo 2020 Olympics.

== Personal ==
Aldersey was named Olympia by her parents as she was born during the 1992 Barcelona Olympic Games. In 2011, she graduated from St Peter's Girls School. She studied at the University of Adelaide, South Australia.

== Club, youth and state rowing ==
Aldersey's senior rowing has been from the Adelaide Rowing Club and later the UTS Haberfield Rowing Club in Sydney. She competed in the 2009 Australian Youth Olympic Festival where she won gold in the women's coxless pair and eight and silver in the coxless four.

Aldersley was first selected to represent South Australia at age seventeen in the women's youth eight in 2009 contesting the Bicentennial Cup at the Interstate Regatta within the Australian Rowing Championships. She made three further South Australian youth eight appearances in 2010, 2011 and 2012. In 2010 she also rowed in the South Australian senior women's eight competing for the Queen's Cup at the Interstate Regatta. South Australia didn't enter eights for the Queen's Cup in 2011, 2012 or 2022 but in 2014 she was back in the five seat of their senior women's eight and she raced six further Queen's Cups between 2014 and 2023. She stroked the 2023 South Australian eight.

Aldersey competed as South Australia's single scull representative racing for the Nell Slater Trophy in the Interstate Regatta in 2013, 2017, 2018 and 2019.

In 2017 in Adelaide Rowing Club colours she won the national double scull (with Madeleine Edmunds) and the quad scull titles at the Australian Rowing Championships. In 2021 in a National Training Centre eight she won the open women's eight title at the Australian Championships.

== International representative rowing ==
Aldersley first represented Australia internationally in 2010 at the World Rowing Junior Championships in Racice, Czech Republic where she won a bronze medal rowing a double scull with fellow South Australian Emma Basher. They also won silver that year at the Youth Olympic Games in Singapore.

In July 2011 Aldersey competed at the World Rowing U23 Championships in Amsterdam and placed fourth in the final of the women's coxless pair.

At the 2014 World Rowing Championships in Amsterdam Aldersey raced in Australia's double scull with Sally Kehoe. They finished third in the final and won the bronze medal. During the preliminary racing Kehoe and Aldersey set a world-record time for 2000m of 6:37.31. This record has stood since.

Aldersey was a member of the Australian women's eight who initially missed qualification for the 2016 Rio Olympics but received a late call up following the Russian drug scandal. WADA had discovered Russian state sponsored drug testing violations and the IOC acted to protect clean athletes and set strict entry guidelines for Russian athletes resulting in most of their rowers and nearly all of their crews being withdrawn from the Olympic regatta. The crew had dispersed two months earlier after their failure to qualify but reconvened, travelled at the last minute to Rio and borrowed a shell. They finished last in their heat, last in the repechage and were eliminated.

Aldersley continued to row at the highest world level into 2017 but moved into a double scull with Madeleine Edmunds. They contested two World Rowing Cups in Europe before winning a bronze at the 2017 World Rowing Championships in Sarasota, Florida. In 2018 at the World Rowing Cup II in Linz, Aldersey was in Australia's women's quad scull which placed third.

In 2019 Aldersey was picked in Australian women's sweep squad for the international season. In an effort to qualify the women's eight for the 2020 Olympics, selectors made some changes between the coxless four and the eight. Molly Goodman moved into the eight and Aldersey was selected at bow in the Australian women's coxless four. She rowed in that crew to a bronze medal at RWC II in Poznan and to a gold medal at WRC III in Rotterdam. Aldersey, Werry, Hawe and Stephan were selected to race Australia's coxless four at the 2019 World Rowing Championships in Linz, Austria. The four were looking for a top eight finish at the 2019 World Championships to qualify for the Tokyo Olympics. They won their heat and semi-final, qualifying the boat for Tokyo 2020. They led the final from start to finish, took the gold medal and regained the coxless four world champion title.

At the Tokyo 2020 Olympics the strong Australian pair of Jessica Morrison and Annabelle McIntyre were asked to double up in the pair and the four. Olympia moved into the Australian women's eight who placed third in their heat, fourth in the repechage and fifth in the Olympic final. Had they managed to maintain their time of 5:57:15 that they achieved in their repechage they would have beaten the winners, Canada, by nearly two seconds and won the gold medal.

In March 2023 Aldersey was again selected in the Australian senior women's sweep-oar squad for the 2023 international season. At the Rowing World Cup II in Varese Italy, Aldersey raced in the Australian women's eight. They led from the start in the A final and won the gold medal. At 2023's RWC III in Lucerne, the eight was unchanged. In the final they led through to the 1500m mark but finished in third place for the bronze medal. For the 2023 World Rowing Championships in Belgrade Serbia, the Australian women's eight was unchanged overall although Aldersey moved into the three seat. They finished 2nd in their heat and then needed to proceed through a repechage which they won. In the A final they led through the first 1000m on a low rating of 37/38 but were rowed through by the high-rating Romanians and a fast finishing USA eight. The Australians won the bronze medal, a 3rd place world ranking from the regatta and Paris 2024 qualification.
