= Taekwondo at the 2010 Summer Youth Olympics – Boys' 48 kg =

Taekwondo competition

The boys' 48 kg competition in taekwondo at the 2010 Summer Youth Olympics in Singapore took place on August 15. A total of 8 men competed in this event, limited to fighters whose body weight was less than 48 kilograms. Quarterfinals started at 14:32, semifinals at 19:02 and the final at 20:09. Two bronze medals were awarded at the Taekwondo competitions.

== Medalists ==
Gold	Gili Haimovitz; Israel
Silver	Mohammad Soleimani; Iran
Bronze	Gregory English; United States
Bronze	Lucas Guzman; Argentina

== Results ==
Legend

- PTG — Won by Points Gap
- SUP — Won by Superiority
- OT — Won on over time (Golden Point)
- WDR — Withdrew

=== Main bracket ===
Quarterfinals
Mohammad Soleimani (IRI)	5
Abubakir Rasulov (UZB)	1
Semih Gokmen (GER)	1
Gregory English (USA)	4
Kirk Barbosa (PHI)	7
Gili Haimovitz (ISR)	8
Vittorio Rega (ITA)	1
Lucas Guzman (ARG)	2

Semifinals
Mohammad Soleimani (IRI)	3
Gregory English (USA)	1
Gili Haimovitz (ISR)	5
Lucas Guzman (ARG)	4

Final
Mohammad Soleimani (IRI)	WDR
Gili Haimovitz (ISR)
