= Swimming at the 2010 Summer Youth Olympics – Boys' 100 metre breaststroke =

The men's 100 metre breaststroke heats and semifinals at the 2010 Youth Olympic Games took place on August 15 and the final took place on August 16 at the Singapore Sports School.

== Medalists ==
Gold	Nicholas Schafer; Australia	1:01.38
Silver	Anton Lobanov; Russia	1:01.44
Bronze	Flavio Bizzarri; Italy	1:02.22

== Heats ==
=== Heat 1 ===
Rank	Lane	Name	Nationality	Time	Notes
1	5	Wassim Elloumi	Tunisia	1:05.49	SUB
2	7	Emmanuel Antonio Ramirez Aponte	Puerto Rico	1:07.47	
3	1	Hrafn Traustason	Iceland	1:07.97	
4	4	Simon Beck	Liechtenstein	1:08.42	
5	3	Tarco Llobet	Bolivia	1:13.55	
6	2	Tsilavina Ramanantsoa	Madagascar	1:14.27	
7	6	Joachim Ofosuhena-Wise	Ghana	1:29.93	

=== Heat 2 ===
Rank	Lane	Name	Nationality	Time	Notes
1	4	Ivan Capan	Croatia	1:03.21	Q
2	3	Kenneth To	Australia	1:03.49	Q
3	8	Matti Mattsson	Finland	1:04.17	Q
4	2	Jakub Maly	Austria	1:04.52	Q
5	5	Panagiotis Samilidis	Greece	1:04.57	Q
6	6	Razvan Tudosie	Romania	1:04.82	Q
7	7	Imri Ganiel	Israel	1:04.89	Q
8	1	Dmitrii Aleksandrov	Kyrgyzstan	1:05.81	

=== Heat 3 ===
Rank	Lane	Name	Nationality	Time	Notes
1	4	Ioannis Karpouzlis	Greece	1:04.71	Q
2	7	Lachezar Shumkov	Bulgaria	1:04.74	Q
3	6	Ximing Wang	China	1:05.07	Q
4	2	Yannick Kaeser	Switzerland	1:05.19	Q
5	5	Christian vom Lehn	Germany	1:05.41	Q
6	3	Vaidotas Blazys	Lithuania	1:06.13	
7	1	Timo Vaimann	Estonia	1:06.73	
8	8	Nts'Eke Setho	Lesotho	1:24.66	NR

=== Heat 4 ===
Rank	Lane	Name	Nationality	Time	Notes
1	5	Nicholas Schafer	Australia	1:02.09	Q
2	3	Flavio Bizzarri	Italy	1:03.14	Q
3	4	Anton Lobanov	Russia	1:03.29	Q
4	6	Thomas Rabeisen	France	1:03.29	Q
5	2	Nuttapong Ketin	Thailand	1:05.71	
6	1	Sheng Jun Pang	Singapore	1:06.46	
7	7	Vinicius Borges	Brazil	1:07.78	
-	8	Ian Nakmai	Papua New Guinea	-	DNS

== Semifinals ==
Kenneth To withdrew from the event and was replaced by Wassim Elloumi.

=== Semifinal 1 ===
Rank	Lane	Name	Nationality	Time	Notes
1	4	Flavio Bizzarri	Italy	1:02.39	Q
2	5	Anton Lobanov	Russia	1:02.60	Q
3	6	Panagiotis Samilidis	Greece	1:03.26	Q
4	7	Imri Ganiel	Israel	1:04.27	Q
5	3	Matti Mattsson	Finland	1:04.39	
6	1	Yannick Kaeser	Switzerland	1:04.64	
7	2	Lachezar Shumkov	Bulgaria	1:04.97	
8	8	Wassim Elloumi	Tunisia	1:05.45	

=== Semifinal 2 ===
Rank	Lane	Name	Nationality	Time	Notes
1	4	Nicholas Schafer	Australia	1:01.51	Q
2	5	Ivan Capan	Croatia	1:03.14	Q
3	3	Thomas Rabeisen	France	1:03.61	Q
4	1	Ximing Wang	China	1:04.30	Q
5	7	Razvan Tudosie	Romania	1:04.84	
6	6	Jakub Maly	Austria	1:04.85	
7	2	Ioannis Karpouzlis	Greece	1:04.90	
8	8	Christian vom Lehn	Germany	1:05.23	

== Final ==
Rank	Lane	Name	Nationality	Time	Notes
1st place, gold medalist(s)	4	Nicholas Schafer	Australia	1:01.38	
2nd place, silver medalist(s)	3	Anton Lobanov	Russia	1:01.44	
3rd place, bronze medalist(s)	5	Flavio Bizzarri	Italy	1:02.22	
4	2	Panagiotis Samilidis	Greece	1:03.08	
5	6	Ivan Capan	Croatia	1:03.24	
6	7	Thomas Rabeisen	France	1:03.62	
7	1	Imri Ganiel	Israel	1:04.28	
8	8	Ximing Wang	China	1:04.55	
