= 2012 World Junior Championships in Athletics – Men's high jump =

The men's high jump at the 2012 World Junior Championships in Athletics was held at the Estadi Olímpic Lluís Companys on 11 and 13 July.

== Medalists ==
Gold	Silver	Bronze
Andrei Churyla; Belarus	Falk Wendrich; Germany	Ryan Ingraham; Bahamas

== Records ==
Prior to the competition, the existing world junior and championship records were as follows.

World Junior Record	Dragutin Topić (YUG)	2.37 m	Plovdiv, Bulgaria	12 August 1990
World Junior Record	Steve Smith (GBR)	2.37 m	Seoul, South Korea	20 September 1992
Championship Record	Dragutin Topić (YUG)	2.37 m	Plovdiv, Bulgaria	12 August 1990
Championship Record	Steve Smith (GBR)	2.37 m	Seoul, South Korea	20 September 1992
World Junior Leading	Ryan Ingraham (BAH)	2.27 m	Nassau, Bahamas	12 May 2012
World Junior Leading	Andrei Churyla (BLR)	2.27 m	Brest, Belarus	29 May 2012

== Results ==
=== Qualification ===
Qualification: Standard 2.19 m (Q) or at least best 12 qualified (q)

Rank	Group	Name	Nationality	2.00	2.05	2.10	2.14	2.17	2.19	Result	Notes
1	B	Ryan Ingraham	Bahamas	–	–	–	o	o		2.17	q
2	B	Falk Wendrich	Germany	o	o	o	o	o		2.17	q
3	B	Ilya Ivanyuk	Russia	o	o	o	xo	o		2.17	q
4	A	Andrei Churyla	Belarus	–	o	o	o	xo		2.17	q
5	B	Péter Bakosi	Hungary	–	o	o	xo	xo		2.17	q
6	A	Dmitry Kroytor	Israel	–	–	o	o	xxo		2.17	q
7	A	Yuriy Dergachev	Kazakhstan	o	o	o	o	xxo		2.17	q
8	B	Sahabettin Karabulut	Turkey	–	o	o	o	xxx		2.14	q
9	B	Brandon Starc	Australia	–	o	xo	o	xxx		2.14	q
10	A	Mariusz Baszczyński	Poland	o	o	xo	o	xxx		2.14	q
11	B	M. Milan Dissanayake	Sri Lanka	–	–	xo	o	xxx		2.14	q, SB
12	B	Pavel Kipra	Belarus	xo	xo	xo	o	xxx		2.14	q
13	A	Ziqi He	China	xo	o	xo	xo	xxx		2.14	
14	A	Muamer Aissa Barsham	Qatar	o	o	o	xxo			2.14	
15	B	Eure Yáñez	Venezuela	–	o	o	xxo	xxx		2.14	
16	B	Yun Seung-hyun	South Korea	xo	o	o	xxo	xxx		2.14	
17	B	Hsiang Chun-Hsien	Chinese Taipei	–	o	xo	xxo	xxx		2.14	
18	A	Ignacio Vigo	Spain	o	xo	o	xxx			2.10	
19	A	Gaël Rotardier	France	o	xo	o	xxx			2.10	
20	A	Park Sang-won	South Korea	o	xo	o	xxx			2.10	
21	A	Dartis Willis	United States	o	xo	o	xxx			2.10	
22	A	Harshith Shashidhar	India	xo	xo	o	xxx			2.10	SB
23	B	Josué da Costa	Brazil	xo	o	xo	xxx			2.10	
24	B	Mohammadreza Vazifehdoost	Iran	o	o	xxo	xxx			2.10	SB
25	A	Christoff Bryan	Jamaica	–	xxo	xxo	xxx			2.10	
26	A	Almir dos Santos	Brazil	o	o	xxx				2.05	
27	A	Tomáš Veselý	Czech Republic	o	o	xxx				2.05	
28	B	Taisuhiko Taira	Japan	o	o	xxx				2.05	
29	B	Trey McRae	United States	xo	o	xxx				2.05	
30	A	Alberto Gasparin	Italy	o	xo	xxx				2.05	
31	B	Maciej Kiendzierski	Poland	o	xo	xxx				2.05	
32	A	Ladislav Bašo	Slovakia	xxo	xxx					2.00	

=== Final ===
Rank	Name	Nationality	2.03	2.08	2.13	2.17	2.21	2.24	2.26	Result	Notes
1st place, gold medalist(s)	Andrei Churyla	Belarus	–	o	o	o	xo	xo	xxx	2.24	
2nd place, silver medalist(s)	Falk Wendrich	Germany	o	o	o	o	o	xxo	xxx	2.24	
3rd place, bronze medalist(s)	Ryan Ingraham	Bahamas	–	–	xo	o	o	xxo	xxx	2.24	
4	Dmitry Kroytor	Israel	–	–	o	o	o	xxx		2.21	
4	Ilya Ivanyuk	Russia	o	o	o	o	o	xxx		2.21	
6	Brandon Starc	Australia	–	o	o	o	xxx			2.17	
7	M. Milan Dissanayake	Sri Lanka	o	o	o	xo	xxx			2.17	
8	Péter Bakosi	Hungary	o	o	o	xxx				2.13	
9	Yuriy Dergachev	Kazakhstan	o	o	xo	xxx				2.13	
10	Sahabettin Karabulut	Turkey	o	o	xxo	xxx				2.13	
11	Pavel Kipra	Belarus	xxx	o	xxx					2.08	
12	Mariusz Baszczyński	Poland	xo	xxx						2.03	

== Participation ==
According to an unofficial count, 32 athletes from 27 countries participated in the event.

- Australia (1)
- Bahamas (1)
- Belarus (2)
- Brazil (2)
- China (1)
- Chinese Taipei (1)
- Czech Republic (1)
- France (1)
- Germany (1)
- Hungary (1)
- India (1)
- Iran (1)
- Israel (1)
- Italy (1)
- Jamaica (1)
- Japan (1)
- Kazakhstan (1)
- Poland (2)
- Qatar (1)
- Russia (1)
- Slovakia (1)
- South Korea (2)
- Spain (1)
- Sri Lanka (1)
- Turkey (1)
- United States (2)
- Venezuela (1)
