= Andrei Churyla =

Belarusian high jumper

Personal information
- Nationality: Belarusian
- Born: 19 May 1993 (age 33) Baranavičy
- Height: 1.9 m (6 ft 3 in)
- Weight: 72 kg (159 lb)

Sport
- Sport: Track and field
- Event: High jump
Medal record
Men's athletics
Representing Belarus
World Junior Championships
Gold medal – first place	2012 Barcelona	High jump

Andrei Churyla (Belarusian: Андрэй Чурыла; born 19 May 1993) is a Belarusian high jumper.

He participated in the high jump at the 2010 Summer Youth Olympics, finishing fourth. At the 2012 World Junior Championships in Athletics in Barcelona, he won a gold medal.
