= 3x3 Basketball at the 2010 Summer Youth Olympics – Boys' tournament =

Basketball at the 2010 Summer Youth Olympics took place at the *scape Youth Space in Singapore.

== Participating teams ==
Group A

- Greece
- India
- New Zealand
- Puerto Rico
- Serbia

Group B

- Argentina
- Egypt
- Iran
- Lithuania
- Panama

Group C

- Central African Republic
- Israel
- Singapore
- Turkey
- United States

Group D

- Croatia
- Philippines
- South Africa
- Spain
- Virgin Islands

== Preliminary round ==
Team advances to Quarterfinals
Team competes in 9th-16th placement matches
Team competes in 17th-20th placement matches

=== Group A ===
Team	Pld	W	L	PF	PA	PD	Pts
Serbia	4	4	0	128	76	+52	8
Greece	4	3	1	92	94	−2	7
New Zealand	4	2	2	79	90	−11	6
Puerto Rico	4	1	3	110	99	+11	5
India	4	0	4	66	116	-50	4

15 August

Greece	22–19	New Zealand

15 August

India	15–33	Puerto Rico

16 August

Serbia	33–19	India

16 August

Puerto Rico	21–23	Greece

17 August

New Zealand	30–26	Puerto Rico

17 August

Greece	14–34	Serbia

18 August

India	20–33	Greece

18 August

Serbia	30–13	New Zealand

19 August

Puerto Rico	30–31	Serbia

19 August

New Zealand	17–12	India

=== Group B ===
Team	Pld	W	L	PF	PA	PD	Pts	Co
Argentina	4	4	0	112	88	+24	8	
Lithuania	4	2	2	120	96	+24	6	+9
Egypt	4	2	2	108	95	+13	6	-4
Iran	4	2	2	95	95	0	6	-5
Panama	4	0	4	58	119	−61	4	

15 August

Iran	27–21	Egypt

15 August

Panama	14–33	Lithuania

16 August

Argentina	27–16	Panama

16 August

Lithuania	29–18	Iran

17 August

Egypt	33–31	Lithuania

17 August

Iran	21–24	Argentina

18 August

Panama	21–29	Iran

18 August

Argentina	30–24	Egypt

19 August

Lithuania	27–31	Argentina

19 August

Egypt	30–7	Panama

=== Group C ===
Team	Pld	W	L	PF	PA	PD	Pts	Co
United States	4	4	0	113	86	+27	8	
Israel	4	2	2	96	85	+11	6	+5
Central African Republic	4	2	2	103	96	+7	6	+3
Turkey	4	2	2	94	104	-10	6	-8
Singapore	4	0	4	76	111	−35	4	

15 August

Singapore	17–25	Central African Republic

15 August

United States	23–17	Turkey

16 August

Israel	20–27	United States

16 August

Turkey	28–24	Singapore

17 August

Central African Republic	25–30	Turkey

17 August

Singapore	14–27	Israel

18 August

United States	31–21	Singapore

18 August

Israel	17–25	Central African Republic

19 August

Turkey	19–32	Israel

19 August

Central African Republic	28–32	United States

=== Group D ===
Team	Pld	W	L	PF	PA	PD	Pts
Croatia	4	4	0	111	67	+44	8
Spain	4	3	1	104	70	+34	7
Virgin Islands	4	2	2	90	84	+6	6
Philippines	4	1	3	98	95	+3	5
South Africa	4	0	4	33	120	−87	4

15 August

Croatia	29–27	Spain

15 August

South Africa	12–28	Virgin Islands

16 August

Philippines	28–34	Virgin Islands

16 August

South Africa	5–33	Spain

17 August

Croatia	33–4	South Africa

17 August

Spain	27–25	Philippines

18 August

Virgin Islands	11–17	Spain

18 August

Philippines	19–22	Croatia

19 August

South Africa	12–26	Philippines

19 August

Croatia	27–17	Virgin Islands

== Placement games ==
=== 17th–20th ===
This round will be contested by the 5th-place finishers of each group to compete for 17th to 20th positions.

Team	Pld	W	L	PF	PA	PD	Pts
Singapore	3	3	0	85	52	+33	6
India	3	2	1	75	64	+11	5
South Africa	3	1	2	44	61	–25	4
Panama	3	0	3	55	82	–27	3

21 August

India	28–22	Panama

21 August

Singapore	21–12	South Africa

22 August

South Africa	11–27	India

22 August

Panama	20–33	Singapore

23 August

India	20–31	Singapore

23 August

South Africa	21–13	Panama

=== 9th–16th ===
Quarter-finals
August 21
New Zealand	17
Iran	29
August 21
Central African Republic	13
Philippines	22
August 21
Egypt	16
Puerto Rico	29
August 21
Virgin Islands	15
Turkey	31

Semi-finals
August 22
Iran	19
Philippines	28
August 22
Puerto Rico	30
Turkey	28

Ninth place
August 23
Philippines	34
Puerto Rico	23
Eleventh place
August 23
Iran	31
Turkey	25

Semi-finals
August 22
New Zealand	29
Central African Republic	21
August 22
Egypt	28
Virgin Islands	26

Thirteenth place
August 23
New Zealand	26
Egypt	29
Fifteenth place
August 23
Central African Republic	29
Virgin Islands	16

21 August

New Zealand	17–29	Iran

21 August

Egypt	16–29	Puerto Rico

21 August

Central African Republic	13–22	Philippines

21 August

Virgin Islands	15–31	Turkey

==== 13th–16th ====
22 August

New Zealand	29–21	Central African Republic

22 August

Egypt	28–26	Virgin Islands

===== 15th place playoff =====
23 August

Central African Republic	29–16	Virgin Islands

===== 13th place playoff =====
23 August

New Zealand	26–29	Egypt

==== 9th–12th ====
22 August

Iran	19–28	Philippines

22 August

Puerto Rico	30–28	Turkey

===== 11th place playoff =====
23 August

Iran	31–25	Turkey

===== 9th place playoff =====
23 August

Philippines	34–23	Puerto Rico

== Final round ==
This stage will be contested by the top 2 teams from each group to compete for 1st to 8th positions.

Quarter-finals
August 21
Serbia	33
Lithuania	22
August 21
United States	28
Spain	19
August 21
Argentina	24
Greece	25
August 21
Croatia	24
Israel	21

Semi-finals
August 22
Serbia	34
United States	29
August 22
Greece	30
Croatia	33

Final
August 23
Serbia	22
Croatia	9
Third place
August 23
United States	25
Greece	34

Semi-finals
August 22
Lithuania	34
Spain	14
August 22
Argentina	22
Israel	33

Fifth place
August 23
Lithuania	28
Israel	24
Seventh place
August 23
Spain	13
Argentina	23

=== Quarterfinals ===
21 August

Serbia	33–22	Lithuania

21 August

Argentina	24–25	Greece

21 August

United States	28–18	Spain

21 August

Croatia	24–21	Israel

=== 5th–8th ===
22 August

Lithuania	34–14	Spain

22 August

Argentina	22–33	Israel

==== 7th place playoff ====
23 August

Argentina	23–13	Spain

==== 5th place playoff ====
23 August

Lithuania	28–24	Israel

=== Semifinals ===
22 August

Serbia	34–29	United States

22 August

Greece	30–33	Croatia

=== Bronze medal game ===
23 August

United States	25–34	Greece

=== Final ===
23 August

Serbia	22–9	Croatia

== Final standings ==
Rank	Team
Gold medal	Serbia
Silver medal	Croatia
Bronze medal	Greece
4	United States
5	Lithuania
6	Israel
7	Argentina
8	Spain
9	Philippines
10	Puerto Rico
11	Iran
12	Turkey
13	Egypt
14	New Zealand
15	Central African Republic
16	Virgin Islands
17	Singapore
18	India
19	South Africa
20	Panama
