= Philippines at the 2010 Summer Youth Olympics =

- Flag of the Philippines
- IOC code: PHI
- NOC: Philippine Olympic Committee
- Website: www.olympic.ph

in Singapore
- Competitors: 9 in 5 sports
- Flag bearer: Patricia Llena
- Medals: Gold 0 Silver 0 Bronze 0 Total 0

Summer Youth Olympics appearances (overview)
- 2010; 2014; 2018; 2026

The Philippines participated in the 2010 Summer Youth Olympics in Singapore.

== Basketball ==
Boys

Squad List	Event	Group Stage		Placement Stage			Rank
Squad List	Event	Group D	Rank	9th-16th	9th-12th	9th-10th	Rank
Mike Tolomia (C); Bobby Ray Parks Jr. Jeron Teng; Michael Pate	Boys' Basketball	Virgin Islands; L 28-34	4	Central African Republic; W 22-13	Iran; W 28-19	Puerto Rico; W 34-23	9
Mike Tolomia (C); Bobby Ray Parks Jr. Jeron Teng; Michael Pate	Boys' Basketball	Spain; L 25-27	4	Central African Republic; W 22-13	Iran; W 28-19	Puerto Rico; W 34-23	9
Mike Tolomia (C); Bobby Ray Parks Jr. Jeron Teng; Michael Pate	Boys' Basketball	Croatia; L 19-22	4	Central African Republic; W 22-13	Iran; W 28-19	Puerto Rico; W 34-23	9
Mike Tolomia (C); Bobby Ray Parks Jr. Jeron Teng; Michael Pate	Boys' Basketball	South Africa; W 26-12	4	Central African Republic; W 22-13	Iran; W 28-19	Puerto Rico; W 34-23	9

=== Group D ===
Team	Pld	W	L	PF	PA	PD	Pts
Croatia	4	4	0	111	67	+44	8
Spain	4	3	1	104	70	+34	6
U.S. Virgin Islands	4	2	2	90	84	+6	4
Philippines	4	1	3	98	95	+3	2
South Africa	4	0	4	33	120	−87	0

16 August

Philippines	28–34	U.S. Virgin Islands

17 August

Spain	27–25	Philippines

18 August

Philippines	19–22	Croatia

19 August

South Africa	12–26	Philippines

=== 9th-16th Classification ===
21 August

Philippines	22–13	Central African Republic

22 August

Iran	19–28	Philippines

23 August

Philippines	34–23	Puerto Rico

== Swimming ==
Athletes	Event	Heat		Semifinal		Final	
Athletes	Event	Time	Position	Time	Position	Time	Position
Jessie Lacuna	Boys’ 100m Freestyle	52.10	19	Did not advance			
Jessie Lacuna	Boys’ 200m Freestyle	1:51.52	7 Q			1:51.95	8
Jessie Lacuna	Boys’ 200m Butterfly	2:06.38	15			Did not advance	
Jasmine Alkhaldi	Girls’ 50m Freestyle	27.10	17	Did not advance			
Jasmine Alkhaldi	Girls’ 100m Freestyle	58.16	13 Q	58.01	12	Did not advance	
Jasmine Alkhaldi	Girls’ 200m Freestyle	2:07.37	22			Did not advance	
Jasmine Alkhaldi	Girls’ 100m Butterfly	1:04.41	24	Did not advance			

== Taekwondo ==
Athlete	Event	Quarterfinal	Semifinal	Final	Rank
Kirk Barbosa	Boys' -48kg	Gili Haimovitz (ISR); L 7-8	did not advance		5

== Tennis ==
Singles

Athlete	Event	Round 1	Round 2	Quarterfinals	Semifinals	Final	Rank
Jeson Patrombon	Boys' Singles	Ouyang (CHN); L 1-2 (7-6, 3-6, 4-6)	Consolation; Olivio (ARG); W 2-0 (w/o)	Consolation; King (BAR); L 0-2 (6-7, 3-6)	Did not advance		

Doubles

Athlete	Event	Round 1	Quarterfinals	Semifinals	Final	Rank
Yuki Bhambri (IND); Jeson Patrombon (PHI)	Boys' Doubles	Džumhur (BIH); Pavić (CRO); L 1-2 (7-6, 5-7, [4-10])	Did not advance			

== Weightlifting ==
Girls

Athlete	Event	Snatch	Clean & Jerk	Total	Rank
Patricia Llena	63kg	83	95	178	5
