= Bulgaria at the 2010 Summer Youth Olympics =

- IOC code: BUL
- NOC: Bulgarian Olympic Committee
- Website: www.bgolympic.org

in Singapore
- Competitors: 21 in 12 sports
- Flag bearer: Teri Georgiev
- Medals Ranked 30th: Gold 2 Silver 0 Bronze 1 Total 3

Summer Youth Olympics appearances (overview)
- 2010; 2014; 2018

Bulgaria participated in the 2010 Summer Youth Olympics in Singapore.

The Bulgarian squad consisted of 21 athletes competing in 12 sports: aquatics (swimming), archery, athletics, boxing, canoeing, gymnastics, judo, modern pentathlon, rowing, shooting, weightlifting and wrestling.

== Medalists ==
Medal	Name	Sport	Event	Date
Gold	Boyanka Kostova	Weightlifting	Women's 53kg	16 Aug
Gold	Georgi Shikov	Weightlifting	Men's 85kg	18 Aug
Bronze	George Tsonov	Athletics	Men's triple jump	23 Aug

== Archery ==
Boys

Athlete	Event	Ranking Round		Round of 32	Round of 16	Quarterfinals	Semifinals	Final	
Athlete	Event	Score	Seed	Opposition Score	Opposition Score	Opposition Score	Opposition Score	Opposition Score	Rank
Teodor Todorov	Boys’ Individual	572	26	Luo (CHN); W 6-0	Sabry (EGY); L 0-6	Did not advance			9

Mixed Team

Athlete	Event	Partner	Round of 32	Round of 16	Quarterfinals	Semifinals	Final	
Athlete	Event	Partner	Opposition Score	Opposition Score	Opposition Score	Opposition Score	Opposition Score	Rank
Teodor Todorov	Mixed Team	Farida Tukebayeva (KAZ)	Paraskevopoulou (GRE)/ Rajh (SLO); L 2-6	Did not advance				17

== Athletics ==
=== Boys ===
Field Events

Athletes	Event	Qualification		Final	
Athletes	Event	Result	Rank	Result	Rank
Georgi Tsonov	Boys’ Triple Jump	15.38	5 Q	15.80	Bronze medal
Georgi Dimitrov	Boys’ High Jump	2.07	10 qB	2.10	10

=== Girls ===
Track and Road Events

Athletes	Event	Qualification		Final	
Athletes	Event	Result	Rank	Result	Rank
Karin Okolie	Girls’ 200m	24.39	5 Q	24.34	5

Field Events

Athletes	Event	Qualification		Final	
Athletes	Event	Result	Rank	Result	Rank
Galina Nikolova	Girls’ High Jump	1.76	6 Q	1.79	4

== Boxing ==
Boys

Athlete	Event	Preliminaries	Semifinals	Final	Rank
Denislav Suslekov	Featherweight (57kg)		Artur Bril (GER); L 2-2+	3rd Place Bout; Fradimil Suslekov (VEN); L 3-8	4

== Canoeing ==
Boys

Athlete	Event	Time Trial		Round 1	Round 2 (Rep)	Round 3	Round 4	Round 5	Final
Athlete	Event	Time	Rank	Round 1	Round 2 (Rep)	Round 3	Round 4	Round 5	Final
Boris Nedyalkov	Boys’ K1 Slalom	1:49.52	17	Ooi (SIN); L 1:49.37-1:35.24	Totka (HUN); L DNF-1:48.85	Did not advance			
Boris Nedyalkov	Boys’ K1 Sprint	1:34.32	12	Dolata (POL); L 1:33.31-1:32.45	Dipoko (CMR); W 1:37.66-2:39.13	Totka (HUN); L 1:35.53-1:30.14	Did not advance		

== Gymnastics ==
=== Rhythmic Gymnastics ===
Individual

Athlete	Event	Qualification						Final					
Athlete	Event	Rope	Hoop	Ball	Clubs	Total	Rank	Rope	Hoop	Ball	Clubs	Total	Rank
Anastasiya Kisse	Girls' Individual All-Around	25.025	24.500	24.200	24.100	97.825	4 Q	23.925	24.400	23.500	24.550	96.375	5

== Judo ==
Individual

Athlete	Event	Round 1	Round 2	Round 3	Semifinals	Final	Rank
Athlete	Event	Opposition Result	Opposition Result	Opposition Result	Opposition Result	Opposition Result	Rank
Yoana Damyanova	Girls' -44 kg	Joseph (HAI); W 101-000	Bae (KOR); L 000-101		Repechage; Thakur (IND); W 021-000	Bronze Medal Match; Sam (CAM); L 000-100	5

== Modern pentathlon ==
Athlete	Event	Fencing (Épée One Touch)			Swimming (200m Freestyle)			Running & Shooting (3000m, Laser Pistol)			Total Points	Final Rank
Athlete	Event	Results	Rank	Points	Time	Rank	Points	Time	Rank	Points	Total Points	Final Rank
Doycho Ivanov	Boys' Individual	11-12	14	800	2:17.65	21	1152	11:56.20	16	2136	4088	18
Beatriche Gencheva	Girls' Individual	11-12	12	800	2:23.53	8	1080	14:45.05	23	1456	3336	22
Beatriche Gencheva (BUL); Doycho Ivanov (BUL)	Mixed Relay	48-44	9	840	2:08.15	19	1264	16:54.85	19	2024	4128	18

== Rowing ==
Athlete	Event	Heats		Repechage		Semifinals		Final		Overall Rank
Athlete	Event	Time	Rank	Time	Rank	Time	Rank	Time	Rank	Overall Rank
Teri Georgiev; Veselin Rusinov	Boys' Pair	3:15.82	2 QA/B			3:20.38	4 QB	3:11.39	1	7
Teodora Gesheva; Petya Mavrova	Girls' Pair	3:37.09	2 QA/B			3:41.18	4 QB	3:46.59	4	10

== Shooting ==
Pistol

Athlete	Event	Qualification		Final		
Athlete	Event	Score	Rank	Score	Total	Rank
Solomon Borisov	Boys' 10m Air Pistol	538	19	Did not advance		

== Swimming ==
Athletes	Event	Heat		Semifinal		Final	
Athletes	Event	Time	Position	Time	Position	Time	Position
Lachezar Shumkov	Boys' 100m Breaststroke	1:04.74	11 Q	1:04.97	14	Did not advance	
Lachezar Shumkov	Boys' 200m Breaststroke	2:21.34	14			Did not advance	
Hristina Muncheva	Girls' 50m Freestyle	27.97	28	Did not advance			
Hristina Muncheva	Girls' 100m Freestyle	1:02.51	44	Did not advance			

== Weightlifting ==
Athlete	Event	Snatch	Clean & Jerk	Total	Rank
Georgi Shikov	Boys' 85kg	152	183	335	Gold medal
Boyanka Kostova	Girls' 53kg	85	107	192	Gold medal

== Wrestling ==
Freestyle

Athlete	Event	Pools		Final	Rank
Athlete	Event	Groups	Rank	Final	Rank
Dzhanan Ahmed	Girls' 60kg	Burkert (USA); W 2–0 (1–0, 2–0)	2	3rd Place Match; Lipatova (RUS); L 0–2 (0–1, 0–4)	4
Dzhanan Ahmed	Girls' 60kg	Puteri (SIN); W 2–0 (4–0, 1–0)	2	3rd Place Match; Lipatova (RUS); L 0–2 (0–1, 0–4)	4
Dzhanan Ahmed	Girls' 60kg	Dhanda (IND); L 0–2 (0–2, 0–7)	2	3rd Place Match; Lipatova (RUS); L 0–2 (0–1, 0–4)	4
