= Rowing at the 2010 Summer Youth Olympics – Boys' pair =

These are the results of the Junior Men's Pair event at the 2010 Summer Youth Olympics.

== Medalists ==
Gold	Silver	Bronze
Slovenia; Jure Grace; Grega Domanjko	Greece; Michalis Nastopoulos; Apostolos Lampridis	Australia; Matthew Chochran; David Watts

== Schedule ==
All times are China Standard Time (UTC+8)

Date	Time	Round
Sunday, August 15, 2010	11:50-12:20	Heats
Monday, August 16, 2010	11:30-11:40	Repechage
Tuesday, August 17, 2010	11:40-12:00	Semifinals A/B
Wednesday, August 18, 2010	11:10-11:20	Final B
Wednesday, August 18, 2010	11:50-12:00	Final A

== Results ==
=== Heats ===
- Qualification Rules: 1-3->SA/B, 4..->R

==== Heat 1 ====
August 15, 12:00

Rank	Athlete	Country	Time	Notes
1	Michalis Nastopoulos, Apostolos Lampridis	Greece	3:08.28	Q - SA/B
2	Jure Grace, Grega Domanjko	Slovenia	3:09.28	Q - SA/B
3	Nikola Simović, Vuk Matović	Serbia	3:10.54	Q - SA/B
4	Onat Kazakli, Ogeday Girisken	Turkey	3:14.17	R
5	Yasin Khan, Gurpreet Singh	India	3:18.86	R

==== Heat 2 ====
August 15, 12:10

Rank	Athlete	Country	Time	Notes
1	Ed Nainby-Luxmoore, Caspar Jopling	Great Britain	3:13.96	Q - SA/B
2	Teri Georgiev, Veselin Rusinov	Bulgaria	3:15.82	Q - SA/B
3	Asier Alsnso, Ander Zabala	Spain	3:16.49	Q - SA/B
4	Siarhei Valadzko, Roman Budzko	Belarus	3:25.75	R

==== Heat 3 ====
August 15, 12:20

Rank	Athlete	Country	Time	Notes
1	Matthew Cochran, David Watts	Australia	3:10.92	Q - SA/B
2	Mile Cakarun, Mate Ledenko	Croatia	3:14.96	Q - SA/B
3	Benoit Demey, William Chopy	France	3:16.92	Q - SA/B
4	Bernardo Nannini, Marco di Costanzo	Italy	3:23.22	R

=== Repechage ===
- Qualification Rules: 1-3->SA/B, 4..->out

August 16, 12:05

Rank	Athlete	Country	Time	Notes
1	Onat Kazakli, Ogeday Girisken	Turkey	3:25.12	Q - SA/B
2	Bernardo Nannini, Marco di Costanzo	Italy	3:26.33	Q - SA/B
3	Yasin Khan, Gurpreet Singh	India	3:29.47	Q - SA/B
4	Siarhei Valadzko, Roman Budzko	Belarus	3:33.32	E

=== Semifinals A/B ===
- Qualification Rules: 1-3->FA, 4..->FB

==== Semifinal A/B 1 ====
August 17, 11:45

Rank	Athlete	Country	Time	Notes
1	Michalis Nastopoulos, Apostolos Lampridis	Greece	3:15.02	Q - FA
2	Ed Nainby-Luxmoore, Caspar Jopling	Great Britain	3:17.37	Q - FA
3	Onat Kazakli, Ogeday Girisken	Turkey	3:18.19	Q - FA
4	Mile Cakarun, Mate Ledenko	Croatia	3:18.36	FB
5	Yasin Khan, Gurpreet Singh	India	3:24.64	FB
6	Asier Alsnso, Ander Zabala	Spain	3:27.59	FB

==== Semifinal A/B 2 ====
August 17, 11:55

Rank	Athlete	Country	Time	Notes
1	Matthew Cochran, David Watts	Australia	3:18.50	Q - FA
2	Jure Grace, Grega Domanjko	Slovenia	3:18.82	Q - FA
3	Nikola Simović, Vuk Matović	Serbia	3:19.82	Q - FA
4	Teri Georgiev, Veselin Rusinov	Bulgaria	3:20.38	FB
5	Bernardo Nannini, Marco di Costanzo	Italy	3:26.44	FB
6	Benoit Demey, William Chopy	France	3:28.55	FB

=== Finals ===
==== Final B ====
August 18, 11:10

Rank	Athlete	Country	Time	Notes
1	Teri Georgiev, Veselin Rusinov	Bulgaria	3:11.39	
2	Benoit Demey, William Chopy	France	3:14.45	
3	Mile Cakarun, Mate Ledenko	Croatia	3:15.56	
4	Bernardo Nannini, Marco de Costanzo	Italy	3:15.65	
5	Yasin Khan, Gurpreet Singh	India	3:18.40	
6	Asier Alonso, Ander Zabala	Spain	3:20.08	

==== Final A ====
August 18, 12:00

Rank	Athlete	Country	Time	Notes
1st place, gold medalist(s)	Jure Grace, Grega Domanjko	Slovenia	3:05.65	
2nd place, silver medalist(s)	Michalis Nastopoulos, Apostolos Lampridis	Greece	3:06.85	
3rd place, bronze medalist(s)	Matthew Chochran, David Watts	Australia	3:07.52	
4	Ed Nainby-Luxmoore, Caspar Jopling	Great Britain	3:09.37	
5	Nikola Simović, Vuk Matović	Serbia	3:10.94	
6	Onat Kazakli, Ogeday Girisken	Turkey	3:16.64	
