= Ryan Ingraham =

Bahamian high jumper

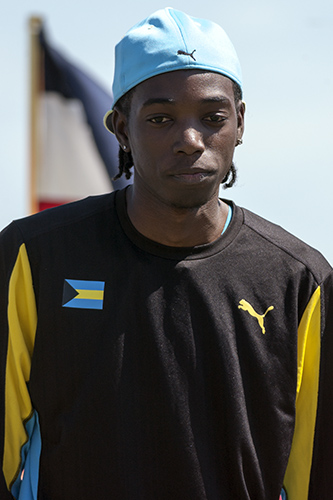

Personal information
- Nationality: Bahamian
- Born: 2 November 1993 (age 32)

Sport
- Sport: Track and field
- Event: High jump
Medal record
Men's athletics
Representing the Bahamas
World Junior Championships
Bronze medal – third place	2012 Barcelona	High jump
Pan American Junior Championships
Silver medal – second place	2011 Miramar	High jump
CARIFTA Games (Junior)
Gold medal – first place	2012 Hamilton	High jump
Silver medal – second place	2010 George Town	High jump
Silver medal – second place	2011 Montego Bay	High jump
CARIFTA Games (Junior)
Silver medal – second place	2009 Vieux Fort	High jump
- Updated on 25 December 2014

Ryan Ingraham (born 2 November 1993) is a Bahamian high jumper.

He participated in the high jump at the 2010 Summer Youth Olympics, finishing first in the B final (ninth overall). At the 2012 World Junior Championships in Athletics in Barcelona, he won a bronze medal.

== Personal bests ==
Event	Result	Venue	Date
Outdoor
High jump	2.30 m	Edmonton, Canada	29 June 2013
Indoor
High jump	2.24 m	Birmingham, United States	18 January 2014

== Competition record ==
Year	Competition	Venue	Position	Notes
Representing Bahamas
2009	CARIFTA Games (U17)	Vieux Fort, Saint Lucia	2nd	1.95 m
2010	CARIFTA Games (U20)	George Town, Cayman Islands	2nd	2.11 m
2010	Youth Olympic Games	Barcelona, Spain	1st (B)	2.13 m
2011	CARIFTA Games (U20)	Montego Bay, Jamaica	2nd	2.10 m
2011	Central American and Caribbean Championships	Mayagüez, Puerto Rico	4th	2.22 m
2011	Pan American Junior Championships (U20)	Miramar, United States	2nd	2.22 m
2012	CARIFTA Games (U20)	Hamilton, Bermuda	1st	2.11 m
2012	World Junior Championships	Barcelona, Spain	3rd	2.24 m
2013	Central American and Caribbean Championships	Morelia, Mexico	1st	2.25 m
2013	World Championships	Moscow, Russia	10th	2.25 m
2014	World Indoor Championships	Sopot, Poland	15th (q)	2.21 m
2014	Commonwealth Games	Glasgow, United Kingdom	9th	2.21 m
2014	NACAC Under-23 Championships	Kamloops, Canada	1st	2.28 m
2014	Central American and Caribbean Games	Xalapa, Mexico	3rd	2.24 m A
2015	Pan American Games	Toronto, Canada	6th	2.25 m
2015	NACAC Championships	San José, Costa Rica	3rd	2.20 m
2015	World Championships	Beijing, China	25th (q)	2.26 m
