= Sailing at the 2010 Summer Youth Olympics – Boys' Techno 293 =

Boys' Byte CII at the I Summer Youth Olympic Games
- Venue: National Sailing Centre
- Dates: August 17–25, 2010
- Competitors: 29 from 29 nations

Medalists
1st place, gold medalist(s)		Mayan Rafic	Israel
2nd place, silver medalist(s)		Chun Leung Michael Cheng	Hong Kong
3rd place, bronze medalist(s)		Kieran Martin	Great Britain

Boys' Techno 293 class competition at the 2010 Summer Youth Olympics in Singapore took place from August 17 to August 25 at the National Sailing Centre. 21 sailors competed in this windsurfing competition.

Sixteen races were scheduled however, due to bad weather conditions, only 10 races plus the Medal race were contested. Only the 9 best results along with the Medal race result were totaled for the final results.

== Medalists ==
Techno 293

Gold	Mayan Rafic; Israel
Silver	Chun Leung Michael Cheng; Hong Kong
Bronze	Kieran Martin; Great Britain

== Results ==
Race M is the medal race.

Rank	Athlete	Race											Net Points
Rank	Athlete	1	2	3	4	5	6	7	8	9	10	M	Net Points
1st place, gold medalist(s)	Mayan Rafic (ISR)	5	1	2	1	2	4	1	1	1	~~8~~	4	22
2nd place, silver medalist(s)	Chun Leung Michael Cheng (HKG)	2	5	3	4	3	1	2	~~7~~	3	3	5	31
3rd place, bronze medalist(s)	Kieran Martin (GBR)	1	2	8	3	1	~~10~~	3	3	4	6	1	32
4	Chaneui Kim (KOR)	3	4	1	~~9~~	8	2	4	6	2	2	3	35
5	Artem Murashev (RUS)	6	6	5	2	12	5	6	5	~~DSQ~~	1	2	50
6	Maxime Labat (FRA)	7	3	6	6	6	3	~~22~~	2	7	7	8	55
7	Bautista Saubidet Birkner (ARG)	10	8	7	~~16~~	5	7	5	4	6	9	6	67
8	Daiya Kuramochi (JPN)	4	7	10	8	7	11	7	~~OCS~~	9	4	10	77
9	Daniele Benedetti (ITA)	8	11	~~14~~	7	4	6	8	9	8	14	12	87
10	Alejandro Luis Pacheco (PUR)	11	13	9	14	10	9	~~OCS~~	13	5	5	7	96
11	Robert Pellowski (POL)	~~15~~	10	13	13	11	13	14	10	10	13	11	118
12	Andras Nikl (HUN)	12	9	12	5	18	16	~~DSQ~~	11	16	12	9	120
13	Ronalds Kaups (LAT)	9	15	16	10	13	~~17~~	9	8	14	15	19	128
14	Jose Davila (MEX)	~~RAF~~	16	4	11	14	12	11	16	12	16	18	130
15	Nikita Rom (EST)	14	17	~~18~~	17	17	18	15	17	13	11	13	152
16	Matias Canseco (PER)	17	12	~~19~~	15	15	15	13	18	15	17	17	154
17	Omar Noureddine Bouabdallah (ALG)	16	14	17	~~DNF~~	RAF	8	12	OCS	11	19	14	155
18	Juan Lejarraga McSweeney (GUA)	18	18	11	18	~~20~~	20	16	14	17	10	15	157
19	Kiran Badloe (NED)	13	19	~~DNF~~	DNS	9	19	10	12	DNC	DNC	16	164
20	Ian Stokes (USA)	OCS	20	15	12	19	14	17	15	18	18	21	169
21	Efstratios Doukas (GRE)	19	21	20	19	16	21	18	19	~~DNF~~	20	20	193

=== Notes ===
Scoring abbreviations are defined as follows:

- OCS – On the Course Side of the starting line
- DSQ – Disqualified
- DNF – Did Not Finish
- DNS – Did Not Start
- BFD – Black Flag Disqualification
- RAF – Retired after Finishing
