= Adelaide Rowing Club =

Australian rowing club

- Motto: Out of darkness, through fire, into light
- Location: Adelaide, SA
- Coordinates: 34°55′11″S 138°35′39″E
- Home water: River Torrens
- Founded: 1882
- Affiliations: South Australian Rowing Association
- Website: www.adelaiderowingclub.com.au

The Adelaide Rowing Club (ARC) is a rowing club located in Adelaide, South Australia. The Patron of the ARC is the Right Honourable former Lord Mayor of Adelaide, Mr Martin Haese.

The club is affiliated to the South Australian Rowing Association (SARA) and fosters a close relationship with Seymour College, having supported the school's introduction to rowing and subsequent entry into the Head of the River.

== The Clubrooms ==
The ARC clubhouse is a two storey building located prominently on the banks of the River Torrens, overlooking Elder Park and Pinky Flat. The upper storey of the clubhouse contains a bar, kitchen and other social amenities for the use by members, as well as an extensive gallery of photographs that cover the life of the club over its history. A boat storage area, gym, Concept2 indoor rower equipment and changerooms are located on the ground floor of the building.

The current building is the third reincarnation of the Club's boatshed. The first shed was opened on 22 July 1882, and lasted for 7 years before being washed away in a flood on 17 April 1889. The second boatshed opened on 14 December 1889, before being destroyed by fire on 6 March 1931. The current building, intended to only be a temporary structure, was opened in October, 1931.

The Club also operates out of a bay at the SARA complex located at West Lakes.

== History ==
The Club was established in 1882 under the original name of the I'Zingari Rowing Club, and soon after changed its name to Adelaide Rowing Club in 1885.

== Traditions of the Club ==
The motto of the Club is "Out of darkness, through fire, into light", and this is reflected in the uniform of the Club, which consists of a black, red and gold horizontal stripes, with gold always on top. These are same colours as the Australian I Zingari Cricket Club, with whom the Club maintains a close relationship.

The Adelaide Rowing Club has developed its own traditions for naming boats. All single sculls, double sculls and coxless pairs are named after Australian rivers. All coxed fours and coxed quad sculls are named Hunter. All coxless fours and coxless quad sculls are named Adelaide and similarly, the Club's coxed eights are named I'Zingari in honour of the Club's original name. These boats then have Roman numerals affixed after their names to denote how many boats have acquired that name.

== Competition & Regattas ==
Adelaide Rowing Club is affiliated with the South Australian Rowing Association (SARA) and competes in local and interstate regattas on a regular basis.

A number of members have been selected to represent Australia at:

- Olympic Games
- World Rowing Championships,
- World Under 23 Rowing Championships,
- World Rowing Junior Championships,
- World University Rowing Championships, and
- Commonwealth Rowing Championships.

Club members compete at the Australian Rowing Championships, administered by Rowing Australia each year.

Adelaide Rowing Club members often comprise a large component of the South Australian State Rowing Team that contest the following regattas:

- Australian Interstate Regatta
- Australian Youth Olympic Festival
- Australian Youth Cup Regatta

Crews from the Club regularly travel to Melbourne to contest the Head of the Yarra regatta in November of each year, as well as the numerous country regattas that are held at various locations in South Australia, including Berri, Renmark, Murray Bridge and Mannum.

The Adelaide Rowing Club has dominated the SARA Senior Men's Premiership in recent years, winning in 2005, 2006, 2007 and 2008.

The Club hosts one SARA Premiership regatta each season, the ARC Twilight regatta and traditionally, this has been the regatta closest to Christmas. In recent years, the Club has evolved this regatta into a sprint match-race format regatta, held at night under lights on the Torrens Lake course.

== Social life ==
The Adelaide Rowing Club has a rich and vibrant social life. Numerous events are held on an annual basis, including:

- The Annual Dinner - a formal Black-tie dinner where the Club's awards and trophies are presented each year.
- The Captain's Cocktail Party
- Opening Day - the official opening of the season is held on this day, usually the Sunday preceding the first competitive regatta of each season. All new boats are christened on this day each year.
- Christmas Party - held in conjunction with the ARC Twilight Regatta
