= Taekwondo at the 2010 Summer Youth Olympics =

Taekwondo at the I Summer Youth Olympic Games
- Venue: Suntec Singapore Convention and Exhibition Centre
- Dates: 15 – 19 August 2010
- No. of events: 10 (5 boys, 5 girls)

Taekwondo at the 2010 Summer Youth Olympics took place August 15–19 at the Suntec Singapore International Convention and Exhibition Centre in Singapore.

== Competition schedule ==
Event date	Event day	Starting time	Event details
15 August	Sunday	19:53	Girls' -44 kg
15 August	Sunday	20:09	Boys' -48 kg
16 August	Monday	19:53	Girls' -49 kg
16 August	Monday	20:09	Boys' -55 kg
17 August	Tuesday	19:53	Girls' -55 kg
17 August	Tuesday	20:09	Boys' -63 kg
18 August	Wednesday	19:53	Girls' -63 kg
18 August	Wednesday	20:09	Boys' -73 kg
19 August	Thursday	19:53	Girls' +63 kg
19 August	Thursday	20:09	Boys' +73 kg

== Medal summary ==
=== Medal table ===
Rank	Nation	Gold	Silver	Bronze	Total
1	South Korea	3	0	0	3
2	China	2	0	0	2
3	Iran	1	1	0	2
3	Russia	1	1	0	2
5	Great Britain	1	0	0	1
5	Israel	1	0	0	1
5	Thailand	1	0	0	1
8	Germany	0	2	0	2
9	Jordan	0	1	1	2
9	Mexico	0	1	1	2
9	Ukraine	0	1	1	2
9	Vietnam	0	1	1	2
13	Kazakhstan	0	1	0	1
13	Portugal	0	1	0	1
15	Canada	0	0	2	2
15	France	0	0	2	2
15	Singapore	0	0	2	2
15	Turkey	0	0	2	2
15	United States	0	0	2	2
20	Argentina	0	0	1	1
20	Cuba	0	0	1	1
20	Lebanon	0	0	1	1
20	Spain	0	0	1	1
20	Sweden	0	0	1	1
20	Tajikistan	0	0	1	1
Totals (25 entries)		10	10	20	40

=== Boys' events ===
Event	Gold	Silver	Bronze
48 kg	Gili Haimovitz; Israel	Mohammad Soleimani; Iran	Gregory English; United States
48 kg	Gili Haimovitz; Israel	Mohammad Soleimani; Iran	Lucas Guzman; Argentina
55 kg	Kaveh Rezaei; Iran	Nursultan Mamayev; Kazakhstan	Daryl Tan; Singapore
55 kg	Kaveh Rezaei; Iran	Nursultan Mamayev; Kazakhstan	Nguyen Quoc Cuong; Vietnam
63 kg	Seo Byeong-Deok; South Korea	Mário Silva; Portugal	Alejandro Valdés; Mexico
63 kg	Seo Byeong-Deok; South Korea	Mário Silva; Portugal	Berkcan Süngü; Turkey
73 kg	Kim Jin-Hak; South Korea	Aliaskhab Sirazhov; Russia	Maksym Dominishyn; Ukraine
73 kg	Kim Jin-Hak; South Korea	Aliaskhab Sirazhov; Russia	Michel Samaha; Lebanon
+73 kg	Liu Chang; China	Ibrahim Ahmadsei; Germany	Stefan Bozalo; Canada
+73 kg	Liu Chang; China	Ibrahim Ahmadsei; Germany	Yazan Al-Sadeq; Jordan

=== Girls' events ===
Event	Gold	Silver	Bronze
44 kg	Anastasia Valueva; Russia	Iryna Romoldanova; Ukraine	Şeyma Tuncer; Turkey
44 kg	Anastasia Valueva; Russia	Iryna Romoldanova; Ukraine	Shukrona Sharifova; Tajikistan
49 kg	Worawong Pongpanit; Thailand	Dana Haidar; Jordan	Jessie Bates; United States
49 kg	Worawong Pongpanit; Thailand	Dana Haidar; Jordan	Melanie Phan; Canada
55 kg	Jade Jones; Great Britain	Nguyen Thanh Thao; Vietnam	Jennifer Agren; Sweden
55 kg	Jade Jones; Great Britain	Nguyen Thanh Thao; Vietnam	Shafinas Abdul Rahman; Singapore
63 kg	Jeon Soo-Yeon; South Korea	Antonia Katheder; Germany	Nagore Irigoien; Spain
63 kg	Jeon Soo-Yeon; South Korea	Antonia Katheder; Germany	Samantha Silvestri; France
+63 kg	Zheng Shuyin; China	Briseida Acosta; Mexico	Yuleimi Abreu; Cuba
+63 kg	Zheng Shuyin; China	Briseida Acosta; Mexico	Faiza Taoussara; France
