= Emma Basher =

Australian rower (born 1992)

Personal information
- Born: 16 June 1992 (age 34)
- Home town: Adelaide, Australia
- Education: Syracuse University; Annesley College

Sport
- Country: Australia
- Sport: Rowing
- College team: Syracuse Orange (2011–2013)
Medal record
Women's rowing
Representing Australia
Youth Olympic Games
Silver medal – second place	2010 Singapore	Coxless pair
Female World Rowing Championships
Bronze medal – third place	2010	Coxless four

Emma Basher (born 16 June 1992) is a Junior World and Youth Olympic rower from Adelaide, South Australia. In 2010 in her 1st year of international competition Basher won a bronze medal at the Junior Worlds and Silver at the Youth Olympics with fellow South Australian Olympia Aldersey.

Basher rows for the Adelaide Rowing Club and competed in the 2009 Australian Youth Olympic Festival where she won gold in the women's Coxless Pair and Eight and Silver in the Coxless Four.

In 2010 Basher was a Year 12 student of Annesley College.

Basher enrolled at Syracuse University in 2011 on a rowing scholarship, where she was a member of the women's crew from 2011 to 2013.
