= Giada Colombo =

Italian rower

Personal information
- National team: Italy
- Born: 23 March 1992 (age 34) Vaprio d'Adda, Italy
- Height: 1.77 m (5 ft 10 in)
- Weight: 67 kg (148 lb)

Sport
- Sport: Rowing
- Club: Tritium S.C.
- Start activity: 2007
- Coached by: Giuseppe Colombo
Medal record
Event	1st	2nd	3rd
European Championships	0	2	1

Giada Colombo (born 23 March 1992) is an Italian female rower, medal winner at senior level at the European Rowing Championships.
