= Falk Wendrich =

German high jumper (born 1995)

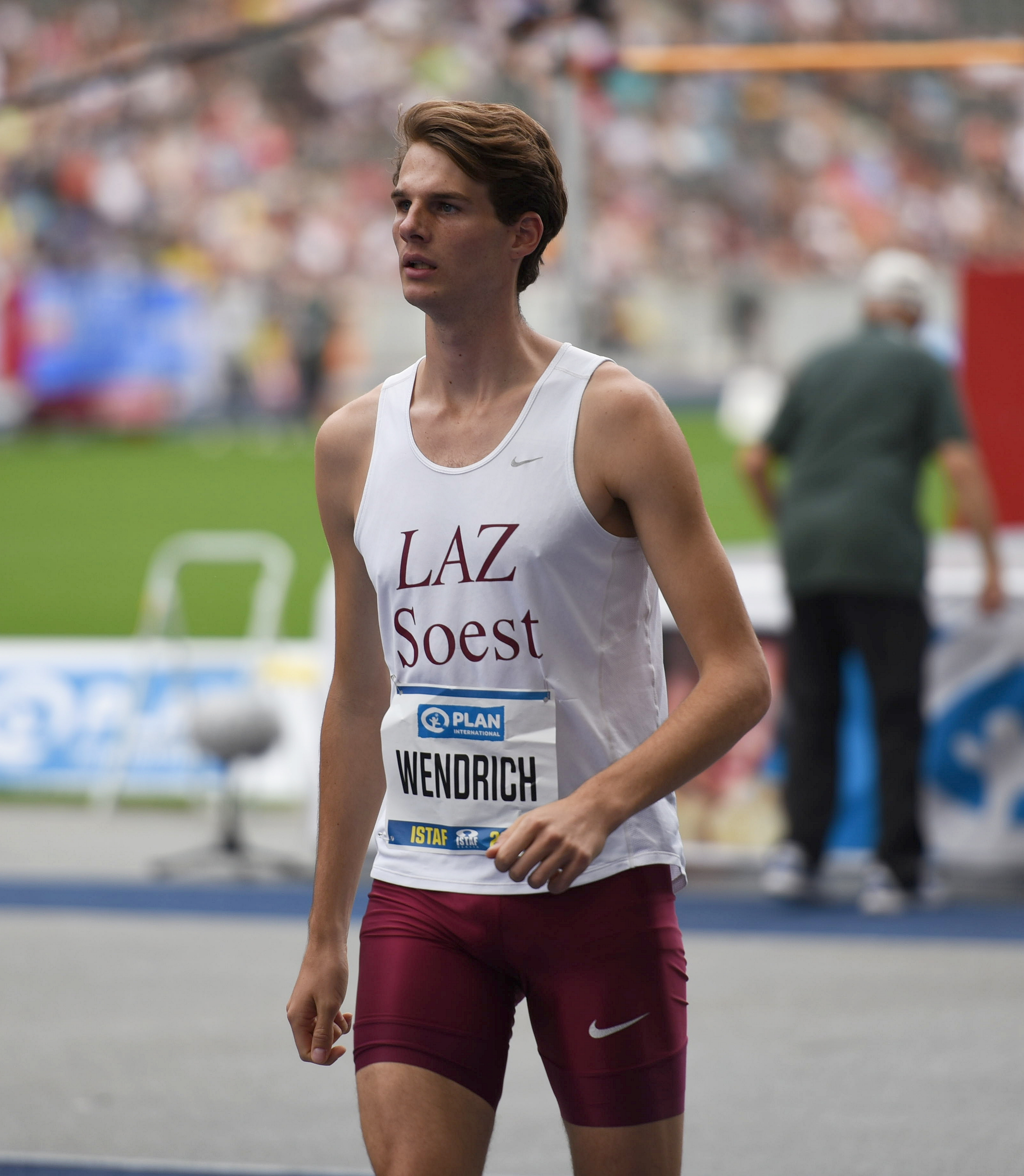
- Falk Wendrich, 2019

Personal information
- Nationality: German
- Born: 12 June 1995 (age 31) Soest, Germany
- Education: Ruhr University Bochum
- Height: 1.93 m (6 ft 4 in)
- Weight: 76 kg (168 lb)

Sport
- Sport: Track and field
- Event: High jump
- Club: LAZ Soest
- Coached by: Brigitte Kurschilgen
Medal record
Men's athletics
Representing Germany
World Junior Championships
Silver medal – second place	2012 Barcelona	High jump
European Youth Olympic Festival
Silver medal – second place	2011 Trabzon	High jump

Falk Henning Wendrich (born 12 June 1995) is a German high jumper.

Wendrich won a silver medal at the high jump at the 2012 World Junior Championships in Athletics in Barcelona. and finished fifth at the 2014 edition. He won gold at the 2017 Summer Universiade, clearing a new personal best 2.29 meters.

In 2019, he won the bronze medal in the team event at the 2019 European Games held in Minsk, Belarus.
