= Athletics at the 2010 Summer Youth Olympics – Boys' high jump =

Athletics – Boys' high jump at the I Summer Youth Olympic Games
- Venue: Bishan Stadium
- Date: August 17–21
- Competitors: 15 from 15 nations

Medalists
1st place, gold medalist(s)		Dmitry Kroytor	Israel
2nd place, silver medalist(s)		Brandon Starc	Australia
3rd place, bronze medalist(s)		Victor Chernysh	Ukraine

The boys' high jump competition at the 2010 Summer Youth Olympics was held on 17–21 August 2010 in Bishan Stadium.

== Schedule ==
Date	Time	Round
17 August 2010	09:05	Qualification
21 August 2010	09:10	Final

== Results ==
=== Qualification ===
The top 8 jumpers qualified to the A Final, while the other jumpers competed in the B Final.

Rank	Athlete	1.90	1.95	2.00	2.04	2.07	2.10	Result	Notes
1	Victor Chernysh (UKR)	-	o	o	o	o	o	2.10	PB
1	Bram Ghuys (BEL)	-	-	o	o	o	o	2.10	
1	Brandon Starc (AUS)	o	o	o	o	o	o	2.10	=PB
4	Gunnar Nixon (USA)	-	o	xo	xo	o	xo	2.10	
5	Navinraj Subramaniam (MAS)	-	-	o	o	o	xxo	2.10	=SB
6	Chun-Hsien Hsiang (TPE)	-	o	o	o	xo	xxo	2.10	
7	Andrei Churyla (BLR)	-	o	o	o	o	xxx	2.07	
7	Dmitry Kroyter (ISR)	-	-	o	-	o	xxx	2.07	
9	Ryan Ingraham (BAH)	-	-	-	xo	o	xxx	2.07	
10	Georgi Dimitrov (BUL)	-	-	o	o	xxo	xxx	2.07	
11	Mmilili Dube (BOT)	-	o	xxo	o	xxx		2.04	
12	Mohammad Reza Vazifehdoust (IRI)	o	o	o	xxx			2.00	
13	Eugenio Meloni (ITA)	xxo	o	o	xxx			2.00	
14	Felipe Mathias Weber Hickmann (BRA)	o	xxx					1.90	
14	Brondon Nursimloo (MRI)	o	xxx					1.90	

=== Finals ===
==== B Final ====
Rank	Athlete	1.85	1.90	1.94	1.98	2.01	2.04	2.07	2.10	2.12	2.13	2.14	Result	Notes
1	Ryan Ingraham (BAH)	-	-	-	-	o	o	o	xxo	o	o	xxx	2.13	SB
2	Georgi Dimitrov (BUL)	-	-	o	o	xo	o	o	o	xxx			2.10	
3	Mohammad Reza Vazifehdoust (IRI)	-	-	o	o	o	o	o	xxx				2.07	
4	Mmilili Dube (BOT)	-	o	o	xxx								1.94	
5	Brondon Nursimloo (MRI)	xo	o	xxo	xxx								1.94	
6	Felipe Mathias Weber Hickmann (BRA)	o	o	xxx									1.90	
7	Eugenio Meloni (ITA)	o	xxx										1.85	

==== A Final ====
Rank	Athlete	1.95	2.00	2.04	2.08	2.11	2.14	2.17	2.19	2.21	Result	Notes
1st place, gold medalist(s)	Dmitry Kroyter (ISR)	-	-	-	o	o	o	o	xxo	xxx	2.19	
2nd place, silver medalist(s)	Brandon Starc (AUS)	o	o	o	o	o	o	xxo	xxo	xxx	2.19	PB
3rd place, bronze medalist(s)	Victor Chernysh (UKR)	o	o	o	o	o	o	xo	xxx		2.17	PB
4	Andrei Churyla (BLR)	-	o	o	o	xxo	o	xxx			2.14	
5	Bram Ghuys (BEL)	-	o	o	o	o	xo	xxx			2.14	PB
6	Chun-Hsien Hsiang (TPE)	-	-	o	-	xo	xxx				2.11	
6	Gunnar Nixon (USA)	o	o	o	o	xo	xxx				2.11	
8	Navinraj Subramaniam (MAS)	-	xo	xo	o	xxx					2.08	
