= Virgin Islands at the 2010 Summer Youth Olympics =

- Flag of the United States Virgin Islands
- IOC code: ISV
- NOC: Virgin Islands Olympic Committee

in Singapore
- Competitors: 8 in 4 sports
- Flag bearer: Ian Barrows
- Medals Ranked 50th: Gold 1 Silver 0 Bronze 0 Total 1

Summer Youth Olympics appearances
- 2010; 2014; 2018

The United States Virgin Islands competed at the 2010 Summer Youth Olympics in Singapore.

== Medalists ==
Medal	Name	Sport	Event	Date
Gold	Ian Barrows	Sailing	One Person Dinghy (Byte CII)	25 Aug

== Athletics ==
=== Boys ===
Track and Road Events

Athletes	Event	Qualification		Final	
Athletes	Event	Result	Rank	Result	Rank
David Walter	Boys' 400m	53.90	23 qD	52.50	23

== Basketball ==
Boys

Squad List	Event	Group Stage		Placement Stage			Rank
Squad List	Event	Group D	Rank	9th-16th	13th-16th	15th-16th	Rank
Kadeem Jones (C); Rasheed Swanston; Amadius der-Weer; Javier Martinez	Boys' Basketball	South Africa; W 28-12	3	Turkey; L 15-31	Egypt; L 26-28	Central African Republic; L 16-29	16
Kadeem Jones (C); Rasheed Swanston; Amadius der-Weer; Javier Martinez	Boys' Basketball	Philippines; W 34-28	3	Turkey; L 15-31	Egypt; L 26-28	Central African Republic; L 16-29	16
Kadeem Jones (C); Rasheed Swanston; Amadius der-Weer; Javier Martinez	Boys' Basketball	Spain; L 11-17	3	Turkey; L 15-31	Egypt; L 26-28	Central African Republic; L 16-29	16
Kadeem Jones (C); Rasheed Swanston; Amadius der-Weer; Javier Martinez	Boys' Basketball	Croatia; L 17-27	3	Turkey; L 15-31	Egypt; L 26-28	Central African Republic; L 16-29	16

== Sailing ==
One Person Dinghy

Athlete	Event	Race												Points	Rank
Athlete	Event	1	2	3	4	5	6	7	8	9	10	11	M*	Points	Rank
Ian Barrows	Boys' Byte CII	~~OCS~~	5	8	~~12~~	2	6	4	5	8	2	1	3	44	Gold medal
Catherine Diaz	Girls' Byte CII	20	24	12	12	21	~~26~~	~~24~~	13	6	19	18	13	158	21

== Swimming ==
Athletes	Event	Heat		Semifinal		Final	
Athletes	Event	Time	Position	Time	Position	Time	Position
Brigitte Rasmussen	Girls’ 50m Breaststroke	35.77	19	Did not advance			
Brigitte Rasmussen	Girls’ 100m Breaststroke	1:20.38	29	Did not advance			
