= Michael Cheng (windsurfer) =

Hong Kong windsurfer

Personal information
- Nationality: Hong Konger
- Born: Michael Cheng Chun-leung; 30 April 1994 (age 32)

Sailing career
- Sport: Sailing
Medal record
Men's sailing
Representing Hong Kong
Asian Games
Silver medal – second place	2018 Jakarta	RS:X

Michael Cheng Chun-leung (Chinese: 俊樑鄭; born 30 April 1994) is a Hong Kong windsurfer.

He qualified for the 2016 Summer Olympics in Rio de Janeiro, and was selected to represent Hong Kong in the men's RS:X event.
