= Dmitry Kroyter =

Israeli high jumper (born 1993)

Dmitry (Dima) Kroyter
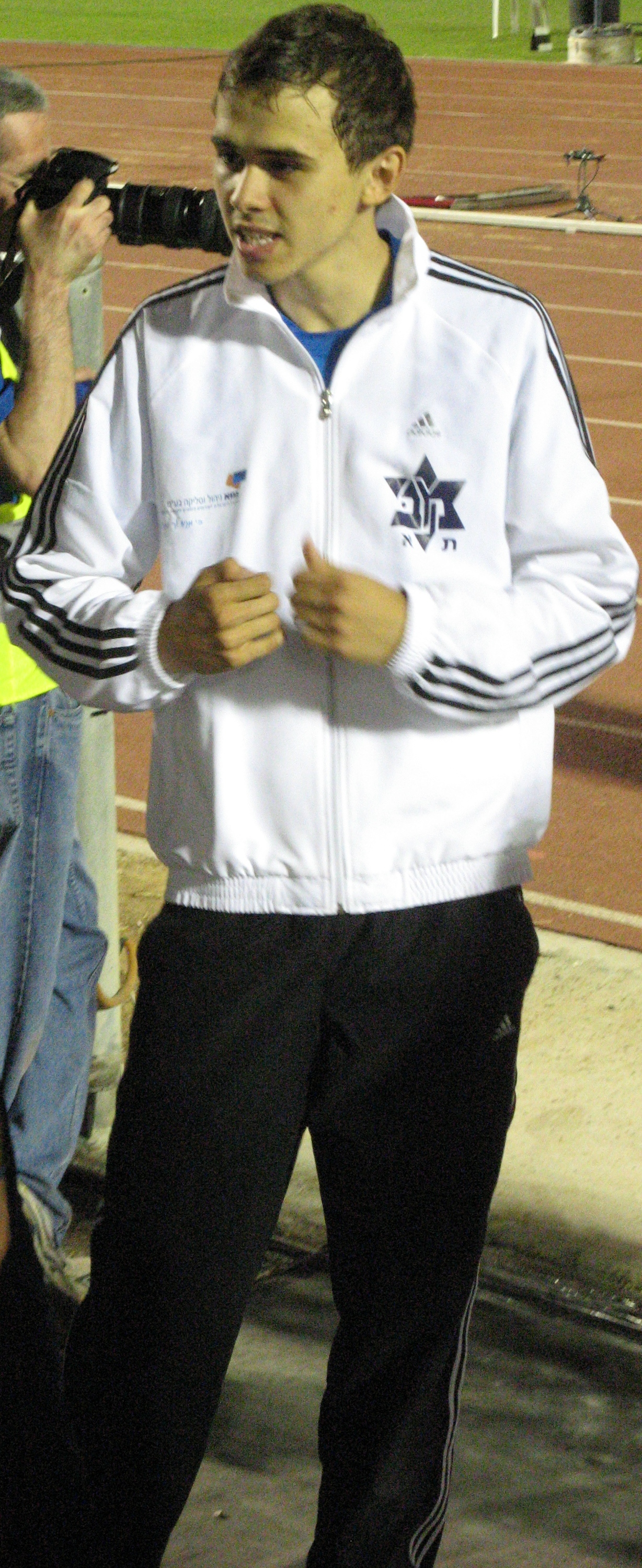
- Kroyter in 2011

Personal information
- Native name: דמיטרי קרויטר
- Nationality: Israel
- Born: 18 February 1993 (age 33) Siberia, Russia
- Height: 1.89 m (6 ft 2 in)
- Weight: 73 kg (161 lb)

Sport
- Sport: Track and field
- Event: High jump
- Club: Maccabi Tel Aviv
- Coached by: Anatoly Shafran

Achievements and titles
- Personal bests: High jump - 2.29 m (Schifflange, Luxembourg; August 2015)
Medal record
Men's athletics
Representing Israel
Summer Youth Olympics
Gold medal – first place	2010 Singapore	High jump
World Youth Championships
Gold medal – first place	2009 Brixen	High jump
European Athletics U23 Championships
Silver medal – second place	2015 Tallinn	High jump
European Games
Bronze medal – third place	2015 Baku	Mixed team

Dmitry (Dima) Kroyter (Hebrew: דמיטרי קרויטר, German pronunciation: [ˈkʁɔʏtɐ]; born 18 February 1993) is an Israeli Olympic high jumper. He is a former World Youth Champion and Youth Olympics Champion.

== Early life ==
Born in Siberia, Kroyter and his family emigrated to Israel in 1999. He grew up in south Tel Aviv, raised by his single mother, Tatiana, who works as a housekeeper. His parents are divorced, and he has no contact with his father Piotr, who lives in Moldova. His brother Evgeni died from a serious liver illness in 2012. Kroyter served in the Israel Defense Forces, completing his service in 2015.

== High jumping career ==
Kroyter has been coached in the high jump since 2005 by Anatoly "Tolek" Shafran, at Maccabi Tel Aviv.

In 2009, he became Israel's first Youth (17 or younger) World Champion at the age of 16 by winning the gold medal with a high jump of 2.20 m at the 2009 World Youth Championships in Athletics (the sixth IAAF World Youth Championships in Athletics) in Brixen, Italy. That year Kroyter also won the Israeli senior championship in the high jump, with a jump of 2.19 m. In June 2009 he set a world record for boys under 17 years of age, at 2.21 m. He was hampered, however, by a thigh injury that prevented him from training.

In 2010, despite a nagging injury Kroyter won the gold medal in the high jump at the Youth (18 or younger) Olympics in Singapore. His jump of 2.24 at the age of 16 at a competition in Moscow in February 2010 remains as of August 2016 the best high jump ever by a European youth under 17 years of age. He was dubbed a "rising young star" at the age of 17 by Allon Sinai of The Jerusalem Post.

In 2011, he cleared 2.28 m while he was 17 years of age (a personal best at the time). Later in the year, at the IAAF World Championships in Athletics in Daegu, South Korea, Kroyter cleared 2.16 m in the Men's High Jump qualifiers. He was the youngest competitor in the event, at 18 years of age.

In 2012, Kroyter came 4th in the Men's high jump at the 2012 World Junior Championships in Athletics in Barcelona, Spain. He also won a gold medal at the 76th Israeli Athletics Championships.

In 2014, he was about to retire because of pain from a relentless injury, but came back from it.

Kroyter won a silver medal in Men's High Jump with a jump of 2.24 m at the European Athletics Under-23 Championships in Tallinn, Estonia, in July 2015.

His career-best high jump as of July 2016 was 2.29 m, in Schifflange, Luxembourg, in August 2015. That met the International Association of Athletics Federations Olympic qualifying standard.

Kroyter represented Israel at the 2016 Olympics, at the age of 23. He exited in the qualification round after having jumped 2.17 m.

== See also ==
- Israel at the Youth Olympics
