= Mayan Rafic =

Israeli windsurfer

Personal information
- Native name: מעיין רפיח
- Nationality: Israeli
- Born: 12 May 1995 (age 31) Herzliya, Israel

Sailing career
- Sport: Sailing
- Class: RS:X
Medal record
Men's sailing
Representing Israel
Youth Olympic Games
Gold medal – first place	2010 Singapore	Techno 293
RS:X Windsurfing Youth World Championships
Silver medal – second place	2013 Civitavecchia	Youth Men

Mayan Rafic (Hebrew: מעיין רפיח; born 12 May 1995) is an Israeli windsurfer who won gold in the Techno 293 class competition at the 2010 Summer Youth Olympics and silver in the Youth Men competition at the 2013 RS:X Windsurfing Youth World Championships.

== Windsurfing career ==
Rafic was born in Herzliya. Rafah began competing in international competitions at the age of 13 on a Techno 293 surfboard. In 2008, he reached eighth place in the Techno 293 Under 15 World Championships and finish ninth in this competition a year later. In 2010, he won the gold medal at the first Youth Olympic Games in Singapore. However, he reached only eighth place in the Techno 293 competition at the European Youth Championship and 13th in the Techno 293 Under 17 World Championships that year.

After the Youth Olympics, Rafic moved to surfing the RS:X surfboard. At the 2010 World Youth Championship in this model, he reached 48th place and in 2011 he improved and finished 37th. At the 2011 RS:X European Youth Championship he finished 11th. Rafic returned to compete in 2013. He finished fifth in the 2013 ISAF Youth Sailing World Championships held in Limassol, Cyprus and 12th in the RS:X European Youth Championship. At the end of the year, Rafic won the silver medal at the 2013 RS:X Windsurfing Youth World Championships, held in Civitavecchia, Italy.

== See also ==
- Israel at the Youth Olympics
