= Central African Republic at the 2010 Summer Youth Olympics =

- IOC code: CAF
- NOC: Comité National Olympique et Sportif Centrafricain

in Singapore
- Competitors: 5 in 2 sports
- Flag bearer: Anthony Gouzhy

Summer Youth Olympics appearances
- 2010; 2014; 2018

Central African Republic competed at the 2010 Summer Youth Olympics, the inaugural Youth Olympic Games, held in Singapore from 14 August to 26 August 2010.

== Athletics ==
=== Girls ===
Track and Road Events

Athletes	Event	Qualification		Final	
Athletes	Event	Result	Rank	Result	Rank
Christelle Guela	Girls’ 1000m	3:12.47	23 qB	DNF	

== Basketball ==
Boys

Squad List	Event	Group Stage		Placement Stage			Rank
Squad List	Event	Group C	Rank	9th-16th	13th-16th	15th-16th	Rank
Rodrigue Kabylo-Bereke; Neil Wilfried Londoumon; Rochris Anthony Gouzhy (C); Jean Bertrand Mbakoutou	Boys' Basketball	Singapore; W 25-17	3	Philippines; L 13-22	New Zealand; L 21-29	Virgin Islands; W 29-16	15
Rodrigue Kabylo-Bereke; Neil Wilfried Londoumon; Rochris Anthony Gouzhy (C); Jean Bertrand Mbakoutou	Boys' Basketball	Turkey; L 25-30	3	Philippines; L 13-22	New Zealand; L 21-29	Virgin Islands; W 29-16	15
Rodrigue Kabylo-Bereke; Neil Wilfried Londoumon; Rochris Anthony Gouzhy (C); Jean Bertrand Mbakoutou	Boys' Basketball	Israel; W 25-17	3	Philippines; L 13-22	New Zealand; L 21-29	Virgin Islands; W 29-16	15
Rodrigue Kabylo-Bereke; Neil Wilfried Londoumon; Rochris Anthony Gouzhy (C); Jean Bertrand Mbakoutou	Boys' Basketball	United States; L 28-32	3	Philippines; L 13-22	New Zealand; L 21-29	Virgin Islands; W 29-16	15
