= Theodoros Tsiloulis =

Greek basketball player

Vikos Ioanninon
- Position: Point guard / shooting guard

Personal information
- Born: May 12, 1993 (age 33) Larissa, Greece
- Listed height: 6 ft 3.5 in (1.92 m)
- Listed weight: 185 lb (84 kg)

Career information
- NBA draft: 2015: undrafted
- Playing career: 2011–present

Career history
- 2011–2012: Peristeri
- 2012–2013: Aries Trikala
- 2013–2015: AEL
- 2015–2016: Aries Trikala
- 2016–2017: AEL
- 2017–2018: Holargos
- 2018–2020: Larisa
- 2020–2021: GS Eleftheroupoli
- 2021–2022: ASK Karditsa
- 2022–present: Vikos Ioanninon

Career highlights
- Greek 2nd Division champion (2022)

Theodoros "Thodoris" Tsiloulis (Greek: Θεόδωρος "Θοδωρής" Τσιλούλης; born May 12, 1993) is a Greek professional basketball player. He is a 1.92 m (6 ft 4 in) tall combo guard.

== Professional career ==
Tsiloulis was born at Larissa and played amateur basketball with multiple teams of Larissa. He began his pro career with the Greek League club Peristeri, in the 2011–12 season. After one year, he joined Aries Trikala of the Greek A2 Basket League, With Trikala, he gained the promotion back to the Greek Basket League. He then moved to AEL, before returning to Trikala after two years, in 2015. The next season, he re-joined AEL, where he had a preety good season with the club.

In 2017, he joined Holargos of the Greek A2 Basket League and he managed to gain the promotion with the club. On June 27, 2018, he joined Ermis Agias, which later was renamed as Larisa in order to compete to the Greek League.

== Personal ==
His brother is the footballer Sotiris Tsiloulis
