= Gili Haimovitz =

Israeli taekwondo athlete

Gili Liel Haimovitz
Personal information
- Native name: גילי חיימוביץ
- Nationality: Israeli
- Born: February 24, 1993 (age 33)

Sport
- Country: Israel
- Sport: taekwando
- Weight class: -68 kg
- Club: Sharabi Martial Arts Club
- Coached by: Yechiam Sharabi and Mark Breginski

Achievements and titles
- World finals: 2010 Youth Olympic Games gold medal in -48 kg
- Regional finals: 2009 European Taekwondo Junior Championships gold medal in -45 kg

Gili Liel Haimovitz (Hebrew: גילי חיימוביץ; born February 24, 1993) is an Israeli taekwondo fighter. In 2009 he won the gold medal in the -45 kg category at the European Taekwondo Junior Championships, and at the 2010 Youth Olympic Games he won a gold medal in the under-48-kilogram event.

== Taekwando career ==
Haimovitz began practicing taekwando as a child. He joined the Israel Defense Forces in 2011, leading to him missing a number of competitions. He grew up practicing at the Sharabi Martial Arts Club. He is coached by Yechiam Sharabi and Mark Breginski.

In 2009 he won the gold medal in the -45 kg category at the European Taekwondo Junior Championships in Trelleborg, Sweden.

At the 2010 Youth Olympic Games he won a gold medal in the under-48-kilogram, or 106-pound, event at 17 years of age.

In 2012 he won gold medals in -45 kg youth at the Trelleborg Open and the Israel Open, in 2015 he won gold medals in -54 kg senior at the Israel Open and the Serbia Open, and in 2016 he won a gold medal in -54 kg senior at the Slovenia Open. He won a bronze medal at the 2016 European Championships in Grozny (U21; -58 kg), and a bronze medal at the 2019 Multi European Games in Sofia (senior; -68 kg).
