= Athletics at the 2010 Summer Youth Olympics =

Athletics at the I Summer Youth Olympic Games
- Venue: Bishan Stadium
- Dates: 17 – 23 August 2010
- No. of events: 36 (18 boys, 18 girls)

At the 2010 Summer Youth Olympics, 36 athletics events were contested – 18 for boys and 18 for girls – on 17–19 and 21–23 August 2010. The events took place in Bishan Stadium, Singapore. Athletes born between 1 January 1993, and 31 December 1994, were eligible to compete. Continents selected their athletes through Youth Continental Championships (Continental Youth Olympic Trials).

While most events mirrored those at the Summer Olympic Games, some events were distinct from the Games' senior counterpart. A 1000 metres race was scheduled in place of the more traditional 800/1,500 metres races. The steeplechase was held over 2000 m, instead of the seniors' 3000 m distance, and the competition featured a medley relay with legs of 100 m, 200 m, 300 m and 400 m (in the Swedish style). Combined (or multi-discipline) events were not contested.

In 2023 Luguelín Santos was suspended by World Athletics on charges of age falsification early in his career. He has admitted that he was too old by seven weeks to be eligible for these Games so may be disqualified.

== Competition format ==
=== Qualification ===
The six continents, Africa, Asia, Europe, North America, Oceania and South America, held their Youth Olympic Trials in 2010.

Continental youth trials
Continent	Location	Dates
Africa	N/A	Late April – early May 2010
Asia	Singapore, Singapore	22–23 May 2010
Europe	Moscow, Russia	21–23 May 2010
North America	Toronto, Canada	May 2010
Oceania	Sydney, Australia or Brisbane, Australia	March 2010
South America	N/A	May 2010

=== Games events ===
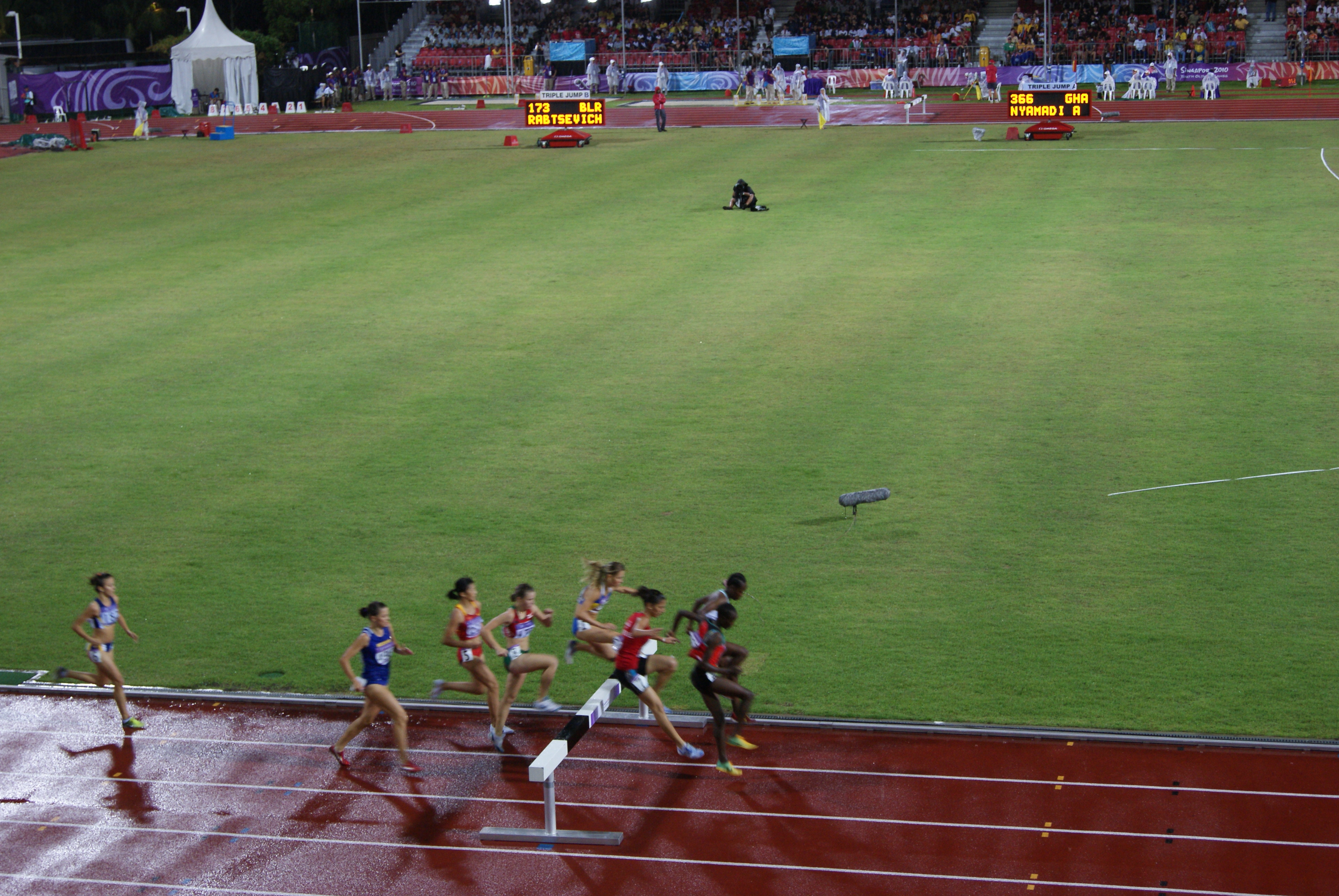
The 2000-metre Girls' Steeplechase event on 23 August 2010, the final day of athletics competition at the 2010 Summer Youth Olympics

Seventeen individual events and one relay were contested, making a total of 18 events for girls and boys. Some events differed between the girls and the boys.

Sprints, hurdles, and relays

For the sprints, hurdles, and relays, there were two stages consisting of two rounds: Round 1 and the finals. Depending on the final number of entries, two to three or more heats were necessary. From results achieved in round 1, athletes were placed in A, B or C (or additional) finals, in accordance with procedures determined by the event delegate. Final placings in each discipline were determined by adding each athlete's time in the stage 1 final to their time in the stage 2 final. Ties were resolved in favour of the athlete with the faster time in either final.

Mid and long distance

Some confusion was caused by a mid-2009 Singapore Athletics document appearing to suggest that placings in the heats and the finals would be added to give a final placing. Depending on their performance in the heats, athletes were allocated to a A, B or C final. The final placings were decided by the placings in the final only, and the placings in the A final determined the medals with no reference to the heats. The B final determined positions 9–16 and so on.

Horizontal jumps and throws

Similar to the mid and long distance events. In the finals for each event, athletes had four attempts.

High jump and pole vault

Similar to mid and long distance events. Final placings in each discipline were determined by adding each athlete's best result in the stage 1 final to his or her best result in the stage 2 final. Ties were resolved in favour of the athlete with the best individual result in either final.

- 100 metres
- 200 metres
- 400 metres
- 100 metre hurdles (girls only)
- 110 metre hurdles (boys only)
- 400 metre hurdles
- 800 metres
- 1000 metres
- 3000 metres
- 2000-metre steeplechase (SC)
- 5000-metre race walk (girls only)
- 10,000-metre race Walk (boys only)
- Medley relay (100-200-300-400 m)
- Discus (boys: 1.5 kg, girls: 1 kg)
- Shot put (boys: 5 kg, girls: 4 kg)
- Hammer (boys: 5 kg, girls: 4 kg)
- Javelin (boys: 700g, girls: 600g)
- Pole vault
- High jump
- Long jump
- Triple jump

== Competition schedule ==
=== Day 1 ===
Event date	Event day	Starting time	Event details
21 August	Saturday	09:35	Girls' 100 m hurdles
21 August	Saturday	10:05	Boys' 400 m
21 August	Saturday	19:00	Girls' 5 km race walk
21 August	Saturday	19:05	Girls' discus throw
21 August	Saturday	19:10	Girls' long jump
21 August	Saturday	19:15	Girls' pole vault
21 August	Saturday	19:35	Boys' high jump
21 August	Saturday	19:55	Boys' 110 m hurdles
21 August	Saturday	20:15	Boys' discus throw
21 August	Saturday	20:30	Girls' 400 m
21 August	Saturday	20:50	Girls' 100 m
21 August	Saturday	21:10	Boys' 100 m

=== Day 2 ===
Event date	Event day	Starting time	Event details
22 August	Sunday	10:00	Boys' long jump
22 August	Sunday	10:20	Boys' 1000 m
22 August	Sunday	10:50	Girls' 200 m
22 August	Sunday	19:00	Boys' Javelin throw
22 August	Sunday	19:05	Boys' 10 km race walk
22 August	Sunday	19:10	Girls' shot put
22 August	Sunday	19:20	Girls' high jump
22 August	Sunday	20:05	Girls' Javelin throw
22 August	Sunday	20:15	Girls' 3000 m
22 August	Sunday	20:30	Boys' shot put
22 August	Sunday	20:35	Boys' 3000 m
22 August	Sunday	21:15	Boys' 200 m

=== Day 3 ===
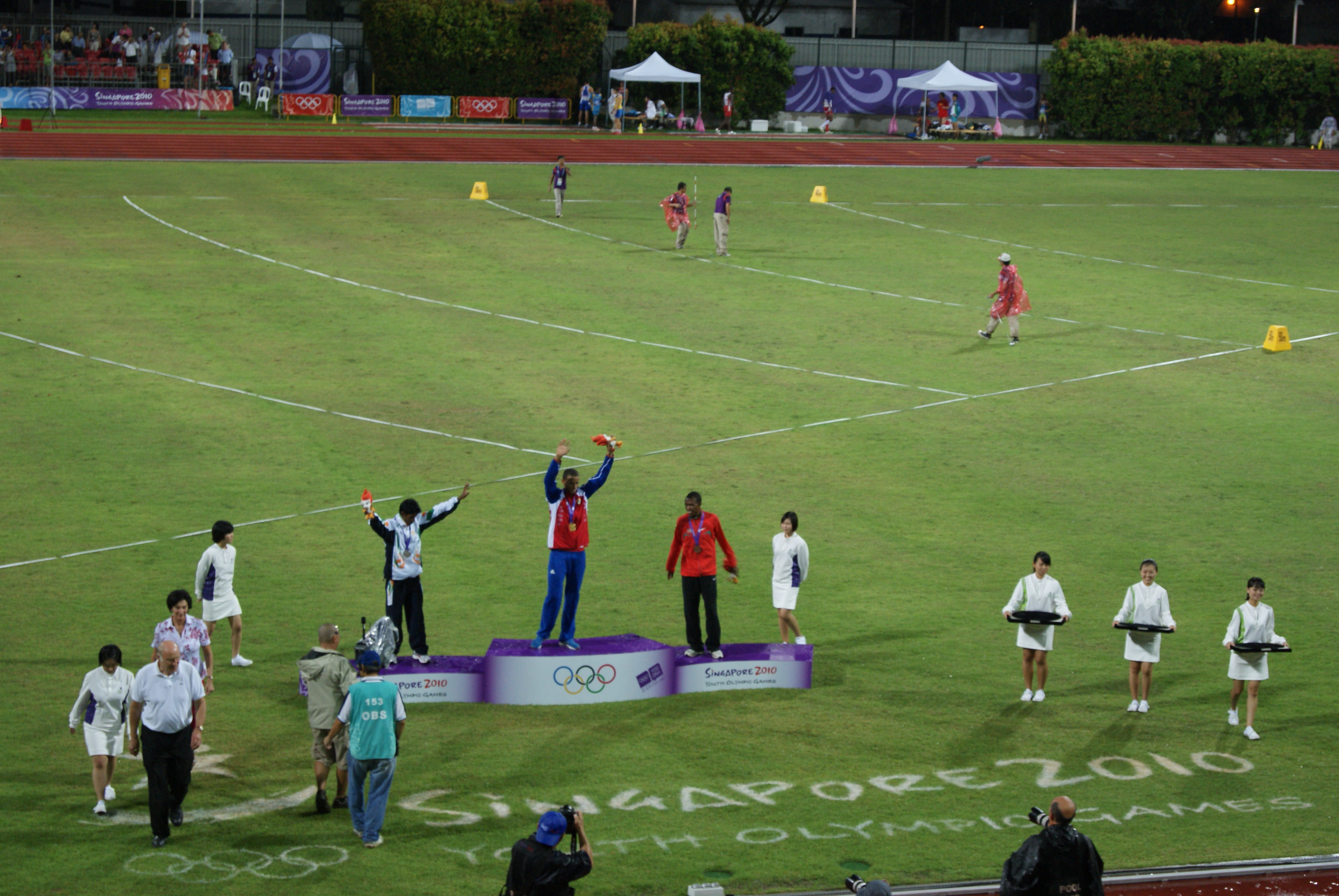
A medal ceremony for a boys' event on 23 August 2010, the final day of the athletics competition at the 2010 Summer Youth Olympics

Event date	Event day	Starting time	Event details
23 August	Monday	09:40	Girls' Triple Jump
23 August	Monday	10:15	Girls' 468201
23 August	Monday	10:50	Girls' 400 m hurdles
23 August	Monday	19:00	Girls' Hammer throw
23 August	Monday	19:05	Boys' pole vault
23 August	Monday	19:40	Boys' 400 m hurdles
23 August	Monday	19:45	Boys' Triple Jump
23 August	Monday	19:55	Girls' 2000 m steeplechase
23 August	Monday	20:10	Boys' Hammer throw
23 August	Monday	20:15	Boys' 2000 m steeplechase
23 August	Monday	20:40	Girls' medley relay
23 August	Monday	21:00	Boys' medley relay

== Medal summary ==
=== Medal table ===
Rank	Nation	Gold	Silver	Bronze	Total
1	Kenya	3	0	3	6
2	Russia	3	0	2	5
3	China	2	4	1	7
4	Ethiopia	2	3	0	5
–	Mixed-NOCs	2	2	2	6
5	Cuba	2	1	0	3
5	France	2	1	0	3
7	Ukraine	2	0	5	7
8	Germany	2	0	2	4
9	Nigeria	2	0	1	3
9	Sweden	2	0	1	3
11	Australia	1	3	0	4
12	United States	1	2	3	6
13	South Africa	1	1	1	3
14	Brazil	1	1	0	2
14	Italy	1	1	0	2
16	Poland	1	0	2	3
17	Dominican Republic	1	0	1	2
17	Eritrea	1	0	1	2
19	Argentina	1	0	0	1
19	Israel	1	0	0	1
19	Jamaica	1	0	0	1
19	Spain	1	0	0	1
23	Japan	0	4	0	4
24	India	0	2	0	2
24	Romania	0	2	0	2
26	Hungary	0	1	1	2
26	Switzerland	0	1	1	2
28	Bahamas	0	1	0	1
28	Belarus	0	1	0	1
28	Cyprus	0	1	0	1
28	Denmark	0	1	0	1
28	Ecuador	0	1	0	1
28	New Zealand	0	1	0	1
28	Qatar	0	1	0	1
35	Great Britain	0	0	2	2
36	Bulgaria	0	0	1	1
36	Czech Republic	0	0	1	1
36	Finland	0	0	1	1
36	Greece	0	0	1	1
36	Latvia	0	0	1	1
36	Morocco	0	0	1	1
36	Uganda	0	0	1	1
Totals (42 entries)		36	36	36	108

=== Events ===
==== Boys' events ====
Games	Gold		Silver		Bronze	
100 m	Odean Skeen; Jamaica	10.42 PB	Masaki Nashimoto; Japan	10.51 PB	David Bolarinwa; Great Britain	10.51
200 m	Xie Zhenye; China	21.22	Keisuke Homma; Japan	21.27	Patrick Domogala; Germany	21.36
400 m	Luguelín Santos; Dominican Republic	47.11	Ruan Greyling; South Africa	47.22 PB	Alphas Kishoyian; Kenya	47.24 PB
1000 m	Mohammed Aman; Ethiopia	2:19.54 PB	Hamza Driouch; Qatar	2:21.25	Charlie Grice; Great Britain	2:21.85 PB
3000 m	Abrar Osman; Eritrea	8:07.24	Fekru Jebesa; Ethiopia	8:08.53	Hicham Sigueni; Morocco	8:08.55 SB
110 m hurdles	Nicholas Hough; Australia	13.37 PB	Dongqiang Wang; China	13.41 PB	Jussi Kanervo; Finland	13.53 PB
400 m hurdles	Norge Sotomayor; Cuba	50.69	Kumar Durgesh; India	50.81 PB	William Mbevi Mutunga; Kenya	51.23 PB
2000 m steeplechase	Peter Matheka Mutuku; Kenya	5:37.63 PB	Habtamu Fayisa; Ethiopia	5:39.10	Zakaria Kiprotich; Uganda	5:41.25 PB
10 km race walk	Ihor Lyashchenko; Ukraine	42:43.93	Oscar Villavicencio; Ecuador	43:46.00 PB	Pavel Parshin; Russia	44:18.04
Medley relay	Americas; Caio dos Santos; Brazil; Odean Skeen; Jamaica; Najee Glass; United States; Luguelín Santos; Dominican Republic	1:51.38	Europe; David Bolarinwa; Great Britain; Tomasz Kluczynski; Poland; Marco Lorenzi; Italy; Nikita Uglov; Russia	1:52.11	Oceania; Lepani Naivalu; Fiji; John Rivan; Papua New Guinea; Nicholas Hough; Australia; Raheen Williams; Australia	1:52.71
High jump	Dmitry Kroytor; Israel	2.19	Brandon Starc; Australia	2.19 PB	Viktor Chernysh; Ukraine	2.17 PB
Pole vault	Didac Salas; Spain	5.05 PB	Thiago Braz da Silva; Brazil	5.05 PB	Theodoros Chrysanthopoulos; Greece	4.95 PB
Long jump	Caio dos Santos; Brazil	7.69	Sho Matsubara; Japan	7.65 PB	Rudolph Pienaar; South Africa	7.53 PB
Triple jump	Radame Fabar Sanchez; Cuba	16.37 PB	Fu Haitao; China	16.14 PB	Georgi Tsonov; Bulgaria	15.80
Shot put	Krzysztof Brzozowski; Poland	23.23 WYB	Jackson Gill; New Zealand	22.60 PB	Dennis Lewke; Germany	21.22 PB
Discus throw	Jacques du Plessis; South Africa	63.94 PB	Arjur Arjun; India	62.52	Jaromir Mazgal; Czech Republic	60.31
Hammer throw	Liu Binbin; China	73.99 PB	Alexandros Poursanidis; Cyprus	70.30	Balazs Toreky; Hungary	70.13
Javelin throw	Braian Toledo; Argentina	81.78	Devin Bogert; United States	76.88 PB	Intars Isejevs; Latvia	74.23 PB

==== Girls' events ====
Games	Gold		Silver		Bronze	
100 m	Josephine Omaka; Nigeria	11.58	Myasia Jacobs; United States	11.64	Fany Chalas; Dominican Republic	11.65 SB
200 m	Nkiruka Florence Nwakwe; Nigeria	23.46 PB	Tynia Gaither; Bahamas	23.68 PB	Olivia Ekpone; United States	23.75 PB
400 m	Robin Reynolds; United States	52.57 SB	Bianca Răzor; Romania	53.10	Bukola Abogunloko; Nigeria	53.47
1000 m	Tizita Ashame; Ethiopia	2:43.24 PB	Andrina Schlaepfer; Switzerland	2:43.84	Damaris Muthee; Kenya	2:45.42 PB
3000 m	Gladys Chesir; Kenya	9:13.58 PB	Moe Kyuma; Japan	9:23.70	Samrawit Mengisteab; Eritrea	9:33.53
100 m hurdles	Ekaterina Bleskina; Russia	13.34	Michelle Jenneke; Australia	13.46 PB	Noemi Zbären; Switzerland	13.50
400 m hurdles	Aurélie Chaboudez; France	58.41 PB	Stina Troest; Denmark	58.88 PB	Olena Kolesnychenko; Ukraine	59.25
2000 m steeplechase	Virginia Nyambura; Kenya	6:29.97 PB	Tsehynesh Tsenga; Ethiopia	6:37.81	Oksana Raita; Ukraine	6:41.49 PB
5 km race walk	Anna Clemente; Italy	22:27.38 PB	Mao Yanxue; China	22:29.42 PB	Nadezda Leontyeva; Russia	22:35.05
Medley relay	Americas; Myasia Jacobs; United States; Tynia Gaither; Bahamas; Rashan Brown; Bahamas; Robin Reynolds; United States	2:05.62	Africa; Josephine Omaka; Nigeria; Nkiruka Florence Nwakwe; Nigeria; Izelle Neuhoff; South Africa; Bukola Abogunloko; Nigeria	2:06.19	Europe; Annie Tagoe; Great Britain; Anna Bongiorni; Italy; Sonja Mosler; Germany; Bianca Răzor; Romania	2:07.59
High jump	Maria Kuchina; Russia	1.89	Alessia Trost; Italy	1.86	Aneta Rydz; Poland	1.79 PB
Pole vault	Angelica Bengtsson; Sweden	4.30	Elizabeth Parnov; Australia	4.25	Ganna Shelekh; Ukraine	4.20
Long jump	Lena Malkus; Germany	6.40	Alina Rotaru; Romania	6.38	Le'Tristan Pledger; United States	6.17 PB
Triple jump	Khadijatou Sagnia; Sweden	13.56 PB	Sokhna Galle; France	13.04	Ganna Aleksandrova; Ukraine	12.64
Shot put	Natalia Troneva; Russia	15.66 PB	Gu Siyu; China	15.49	Anna Wloka; Poland	15.48
Discus throw	Shanice Craft; Germany	55.49 PB	Krisztina Váradi; Hungary	49.92	Heidi Schmidt; Sweden	47.57 PB
Hammer throw	Alexia Sedykh; France	59.08	Alena Navahrodskaya; Belarus	57.34	Xia Youlian; China	56.62
Javelin throw	Kateryna Derun; Ukraine	54.59 PB	Lismania Munoz Barcelay; Cuba	52.40	Hannah Carson; United States	50.64

== Participating nations ==
170 nations will participate in athletics.:

- Afghanistan (1)
- Albania (1)
- Algeria (6)
- Andorra (1)
- Angola (1)
- Antigua and Barbuda (3)
- Argentina (5)
- Armenia (1)
- Australia (17)
- Austria (2)
- Bahamas (8)
- Bahrain (2)
- Barbados (5)
- Belarus (10)
- Belgium (2)
- Belize (3)
- Benin (2)
- Bermuda (2)
- Bolivia (1)
- Bosnia and Herzegovina (1)
- Botswana (2)
- Brazil (15)
- British Virgin Islands (3)
- Brunei (1)
- Bulgaria (4)
- Burkina Faso (1)
- Burundi (4)
- Cambodia (1)
- Cameroon (1)
- Canada (9)
- Cape Verde (1)
- Central African Republic (1)
- Chad (2)
- Chile (3)
- China (14)
- Chinese Taipei (9)
- Colombia (2)
- Comoros (2)
- Democratic Republic of the Congo (1)
- Republic of the Congo (1)
- Costa Rica (1)
- Ivory Coast (1)
- Croatia (3)
- Cuba (11)
- Cyprus (2)
- Czech Republic (7)
- Denmark (2)
- Djibouti (3)
- Dominica (3)
- Dominican Republic (3)
- Ecuador (2)
- Egypt (7)
- Equatorial Guinea (3)
- Eritrea (3)
- Estonia (2)
- Ethiopia (5)
- Fiji (2)
- Finland (7)
- France (7)
- Federated States of Micronesia (1)
- Gabon (2)
- The Gambia (4)
- Germany (16)
- Ghana (2)
- Great Britain (13)
- Greece (10)
- Grenada (3)
- Guam (1)
- Guinea (1)
- Guinea-Bissau (2)
- Guyana (2)
- Haiti (1)
- Hong Kong (1)
- Hungary (7)
- India (5)
- Iran (1)
- Ireland (2)
- Israel (1)
- Italy (12)
- Jamaica (12)
- Japan (15)
- Kazakhstan (5)
- Kenya (7)
- Kiribati (2)
- North Korea (1)
- South Korea (3)
- Kuwait (1)
- Laos (1)
- Latvia (1)
- Lesotho (2)
- Liberia (1)
- Libya (1)
- Lithuania (7)
- Luxembourg (2)
- Madagascar (1)
- Malawi (1)
- Malaysia (3)
- Maldives (1)
- Mali (2)
- Malta (2)
- Mauritania (4)
- Mauritius (4)
- Mexico (7)
- Moldova (2)
- Mongolia (2)
- Morocco (5)
- Mozambique (2)
- Myanmar (1)
- Namibia (2)
- Nauru (2)
- Nepal (3)
- Netherlands Antilles (2)
- New Zealand (10)
- Nigeria (8)
- Oman (1)
- Palau (2)
- Palestine (1)
- Panama (2)
- Papua New Guinea (1)
- Paraguay (1)
- Peru (2)
- Poland (12)
- Portugal (1)
- Puerto Rico (3)
- Qatar (1)
- Romania (8)
- Russia (10)
- Rwanda (2)
- Saint Kitts and Nevis (2)
- Saint Lucia (1)
- Saint Vincent and the Grenadines (2)
- Samoa (1)
- São Tomé and Príncipe (1)
- Saudi Arabia (6)
- Senegal (1)
- Serbia (2)
- Seychelles (1)
- Sierra Leone (3)
- Singapore (6)
- Slovakia (2)
- Slovenia (4)
- Solomon Islands (2)
- Somalia (2)
- South Africa (15)
- Spain (10)
- Sri Lanka (1)
- Sudan (6)
- Suriname (1)
- Swaziland (2)
- Sweden (5)
- Switzerland (3)
- Syria (1)
- Tajikistan (2)
- Tanzania (2)
- Timor-Leste (1)
- Thailand (5)
- Togo (1)
- Trinidad and Tobago (4)
- Tunisia (9)
- Turkey (6)
- Tuvalu (1)
- Uganda (2)
- Ukraine (15)
- United States (20)
- Uzbekistan (2)
- Vietnam (1)
- Virgin Islands (1)
- Yemen (3)
- Zambia (1)
- Zimbabwe (2)

== See also ==
- Athletics at the 1998 World Youth Games
