= Athletics at the 2010 Summer Youth Olympics – Girls' 1000 metres =

Athletics – Girls' 1000 metres at the I Summer Youth Olympic Games
- Venue: Bishan Stadium
- Date: August 19–23
- Competitors: 33 from 33 nations

Medalists
1st place, gold medalist(s)		Tizita Ashame	Ethiopia
2nd place, silver medalist(s)		Andrina Schlaepfer	Switzerland
3rd place, bronze medalist(s)		Damaris Muthee	Kenya

The girls' 1,000 metres event at the 2010 Youth Olympic Games was held on 19–23 August 2010 in Bishan Stadium.

== Schedule ==
Date	Time	Round
19 August 2010	10:30	Heats
23 August 2010	10:05	Final

== Results ==
=== Heats ===
Rank	Heat	Athlete	Time	Notes	Q
1	1	Anastasiya Tkachuk (UKR)	2:43.55		FA
2	1	Georgia Peel (GBR)	2:45.78		FA
3	1	Andrina Schlaepfer (SUI)	2:46.09		FA
4	2	Tizita Ashame (ETH)	2:46.34		FA
5	1	Jenny Blundell (AUS)	2:46.58		FA
6	2	Hanna Klein (GER)	2:46.93		FA
7	2	Damaris Muthee (KEN)	2:47.09	PB	FA
8	2	María Mancebo (DOM)	2:51.62	PB	FA
9	1	Claudia Francis (USA)	2:51.99	SB	FA
10	2	Mai Nishiwaki (JPN)	2:52.85		FA
11	2	Thato Makhafola (RSA)	2:52.92		FA
12	1	Vanessa Philbert (AHO)	2:57.83		FA
13	1	Esin Bahar Dolek (TUR)	2:59.03		FA
14	2	Pouwedeou Adjodi (TOG)	3:02.63		FA
15	1	Marina Ayene Nvo (GEQ)	3:02.64		FA
16	1	Rita Luonab (GHA)	3:03.06		FA
17	1	Julia Handyene (NAM)	3:04.29		FA
18	1	Ranjitha Raja (SIN)	3:07.66		FB
19	1	Jevina Straker (GUY)	3:08.19		FB
20	2	Taylor Bean (BER)	3:08.32		FB
21	2	Swe Li Myint Myint (MYA)	3:09.92		FB
22	2	Mitsou Minda (CHA)	3:11.15	SB	FB
23	1	Christelle Guela (CAF)	3:12.47		FB
24	1	Francine Bukuru (BDI)	3:14.65	PB	FB
25	1	Saredo Abdi (DJI)	3:19.46		FB
26	2	Kaysanda Alexander (DMA)	3:21.10		FB
27	1	Entisar Shushan (LBA)	3:21.24		FB
28	2	Belqes Sharaf Addin (YEM)	3:37.40		FB
29	2	Aicha Fall (MTN)	3:38.36		FB
30	2	Beatrice Derose (HAI)	4:10.68		FB
	1	Manal El Behraoui (MAR)	DNF		FB
	2	Winnie George (BOT)	DSQ		FB
	2	Dayrina Sotolongo Garcia (CUB)	DSQ		FB

=== Finals ===
==== Final B ====
Rank	Athlete	Time	Notes
1	Manal El Behraoui (MAR)	2:53.87	
2	Winnie George (BOT)	2:55.46	
3	Dayrina Sotolongo Garcia (CUB)	2:56.74	
4	Jevina Straker (GUY)	2:57.41	
5	Ranjitha Raja (SIN)	3:03.90	
6	Mitsou Minda (CHA)	3:04.35	SB
7	Swe Li Myint Myint (MYA)	3:09.58	
8	Taylor Bean (BER)	3:11.46	
9	Francine Bukuru (BDI)	3:12.59	PB
10	Entisar Shushan (LBA)	3:13.21	
11	Kaysanda Alexander (DMA)	3:14.91	
12	Belqes Sharaf Addin (YEM)	3:41.99	
	Christelle Guela (CAF)	DNF	
	Saredo Abdi (DJI)	DNS	
	Beatrice Derose (HAI)	DNS	
	Aicha Fall (MTN)	DNS	

==== Final A ====
Rank	Athlete	Time	Notes
1st place, gold medalist(s)	Tizita Ashame (ETH)	2:43.24	PB
2nd place, silver medalist(s)	Andrina Schlaepfer (SUI)	2:43.84	
3rd place, bronze medalist(s)	Damaris Muthee (KEN)	2:45.42	PB
4	Anastasiya Tkachuk (UKR)	2:45.96	
5	Jenny Blundell (AUS)	2:46.82	
6	Georgia Peel (GBR)	2:49.56	
7	Hanna Klein (GER)	2:51.40	
8	Thato Makhafola (RSA)	2:52.65	
9	Mai Nishiwaki (JPN)	2:54.39	
10	Vanessa Philbert (AHO)	2:54.99	
11	María Mancebo (DOM)	2:55.16	
12	Claudia Francis (USA)	2:55.73	
13	Esin Bahar Dolek (TUR)	2:57.73	
14	Rita Luonab (GHA)	2:58.26	
15	Pouwedeou Adjodi (TOG)	3:00.52	
16	Julia Handyene (NAM)	3:00.64	
17	Marina Ayene Nvo (GEQ)	3:05.17	
