= Athletics at the 2010 Summer Youth Olympics – Boys' 3000 metres =

Athletics – Boys' 3000 metres at the I Summer Youth Olympic Games
- Venue: Bishan Stadium
- Date: August 17–22
- Competitors: 23 from 23 nations

Medalists
1st place, gold medalist(s)		Abrar Osman	Eritrea
2nd place, silver medalist(s)		Fekru Jebesa	Ethiopia
3rd place, bronze medalist(s)		Hicham Sigueni	Morocco

The boys' 3,000 metres competition at the 2010 Youth Olympic Games was held on 17–22 August 2010 in Bishan Stadium.

== Schedule ==
Date	Time	Round
17 August 2010	09:45	Heats
22 August 2010	09:40	Final

== Results ==
=== Heats ===
Rank	Athlete	Time	Notes	Q
1	Fekru Jebesa (ETH)	8:12.65		FA
2	Abrar Osman (ERI)	8:12.80		FA
3	Hicham Sigueni (MAR)	8:12.95	SB	FA
4	Kazuto Nishiike (JPN)	8:13.05	PB	FA
5	Josphat Kiprop Kiptis (KEN)	8:14.08		FA
6	Harry Mulenga (ZAM)	8:14.38	PB	FA
7	Mwita Kopiro Marwa (TAN)	8:14.60		FA
8	Alex Cherop (UGA)	8:14.97		FA
9	Indrajeet Patel (IND)	8:15.02		FA
10	Ibrahim Abdullah (KSA)	8:16.33	PB	FA
11	Pontien Ntawuyirushintege (RWA)	8:17.99		FA
12	Claudiu Cimpoeru (ROU)	8:30.84	SB	FA
13	Abdelmunaim Adam (SUD)	8:33.03		FB
14	Emmanuel Gyang Gwom (NGR)	8:38.45		FB
15	Zabulon Ndikumana (BDI)	8:50.77		FB
16	Federico Bruno (ARG)	8:52.78		FB
17	Amin Cheniti (ALG)	8:54.43		FB
18	Mohamed Ali (NZL)	9:07.60		FB
19	Eamonn Kichuk (CAN)	9:17.37		FB
20	Samphors Som (CAM)	10:16.03		FB
	Aboubaker Sougueh Houffaneh (DJI)	DNF		FB
	Saleck Khattat (MTN)	DSQ		FB
	Ribeiro Pinto de Carvalho (TLS)	DSQ		FB

=== Finals ===
==== Final B ====
Rank	Athlete	Time	Notes
1	Abdelmunaim Adam (SUD)	8:27.19	
2	Zabulon Ndikumana (BDI)	8:28.76	PB
3	Amin Cheniti (ALG)	8:32.85	PB
4	Emmanuel Gyang Gwom (NGR)	8:49.68	
5	Federico Bruno (ARG)	8:58.63	
6	Mohamed Ali (NZL)	9:01.03	
7	Eamonn Kichuk (CAN)	9:25.90	
	Samphors Som (CAM)	DNS	
	Aboubaker Sougueh Houffaneh (DJI)	DNS	
	Saleck Khattat (MTN)	DNS	
	Ribeiro Pinto de Carvalho (TLS)	DNS	

==== Final A ====
Rank	Athlete	Time	Notes
1st place, gold medalist(s)	Abrar Osman (ERI)	8:07.24	
2nd place, silver medalist(s)	Fekru Jebesa (ETH)	8:08.53	
3rd place, bronze medalist(s)	Hicham Sigueni (MAR)	8:08.55	SB
4	Kazuto Nishiike (JPN)	8:08.57	PB
5	Harry Mulenga (ZAM)	8:11.26	PB
6	Mwita Kopiro Marwa (TAN)	8:11.37	
7	Alex Cherop (UGA)	8:13.11	
8	Pontien Ntawuyirushintege (RWA)	8:14.59	
9	Ibrahim Abdullah (KSA)	8:15.23	PB
10	Claudiu Cimpoeru (ROU)	8:32.85	
11	Indrajeet Patel (IND)	8:36.73	
	Josphat Kiprop Kiptis (KEN)	DSQ	
