= Athletics at the 2010 Summer Youth Olympics – Girls' 3000 metres =

Athletics – Girls' 3000 metres at the I Summer Youth Olympic Games
- Venue: Bishan Stadium
- Date: August 17–22
- Competitors: 20 from 20 nations

Medalists
1st place, gold medalist(s)		Gladys Chesir	Kenya
2nd place, silver medalist(s)		Moe Kyuma	Japan
3rd place, bronze medalist(s)		Samrawit Mengisteab	Eritrea

The girls' 3,000 metres event at the 2010 Youth Olympic Games was held on 17–22 August 2010 in Bishan Stadium.

== Schedule ==
Date	Time	Round
17 August 2010	09:20	Heats
22 August 2010	09:15	Final

== Results ==
=== Heats ===
Rank	Athlete	Time	Notes	Q
1	Gladys Chesir (KEN)	9:25.44	=PB	FA
2	Moe Kyuma (JPN)	9:35.33		FA
3	Monica Florea (ROU)	9:39.00	PB	FA
4	Samrawit Mengisteab (ERI)	9:43.25		FA
5	Aikaterini Berdousi (GRE)	9:44.73	PB	FA
6	Sithulisiwe Zhou (ZIM)	9:45.76	PB	FA
7	Nina Savina (BLR)	9:48.45		FA
8	Yong Sim Ko (PRK)	9:59.35	PB	FA
9	Ndapandula Nghinaunye (NAM)	10:04.53		FA
10	Valentine Marchese (ITA)	10:06.08		FA
11	Anna-Lisa Uttley (NZL)	10:07.69		FB
12	Gabrielle Edwards (CAN)	10:18.59		FB
13	Neema Emanuel Sule (TAN)	10:29.07		FB
14	Bishwa Rupa Budha (NEP)	10:41.42	PB	FB
15	Kenryca Shenika Francis (ANT)	11:07.12		FB
	Zourha Ali (DJI)	DNF		FB
	Devote Inamahoro (BDI)	DSQ		FB
	Charo Inga (PER)	DSQ		FB
	Mpho Cecilia Moeti (LES)	DSQ		FB
	Jacqueline Murekatete (RWA)	DSQ		FB

=== Finals ===
==== Final B ====
Rank	Athlete	Time	Notes
1	Jacqueline Murekatete (RWA)	9:55.83	
2	Anna-Lisa Uttley (NZL)	10:07.63	
3	Devote Inamahoro (BDI)	10:15.49	
4	Neema Emanuel Sule (TAN)	10:22.73	
5	Gabrielle Edwards (CAN)	10:32.66	
6	Mpho Cecilia Moeti (LES)	10:45.40	PB
7	Kenryca Shenika Francis (ANT)	11:11.11	
	Zourha Ali (DJI)	DNS	
	Bishwa Rupa Budha (NEP)	DNS	
	Charo Inga (PER)	DNS	

==== Final A ====
Rank	Athlete	Time	Notes
1st place, gold medalist(s)	Gladys Chesir (KEN)	9:13.58	PB
2nd place, silver medalist(s)	Moe Kyuma (JPN)	9:23.70	
3rd place, bronze medalist(s)	Samrawit Mengisteab (ERI)	9:33.53	
4	Aikaterini Berdousi (GRE)	9:37.56	PB
5	Monica Florea (ROU)	9:38.64	PB
6	Nina Savina (BLR)	9:50.04	
7	Sithulisiwe Zhou (ZIM)	9:53.88	
8	Ndapandula Nghinaunye (NAM)	10:08.62	
9	Valentine Marchese (ITA)	10:11.18	
10	Yong Sim Ko (PRK)	10:20.44	
