= Athletics at the 2010 Summer Youth Olympics – Boys' 1000 metres =

Athletics – Boys' 1000 metres at the I Summer Youth Olympic Games
- Venue: Bishan Stadium
- Date: August 18–22
- Competitors: 21 from 21 nations

Medalists
1st place, gold medalist(s)		Mohammed Geleto	Ethiopia
2nd place, silver medalist(s)		Hamza Driouch	Qatar
3rd place, bronze medalist(s)		Charlie Grice	Great Britain

The boys' 1,000 metres competition at the 2010 Youth Olympic Games was held on 18–22 August 2010 in Bishan Stadium.

== Schedule ==
Date	Time	Round
18 August 2010	10:20	Heats
22 August 2010	10:05	Final

== Results ==
=== Heats ===
Rank	Heat	Athlete	Time	Notes	Q
1	2	Mohammed Geleto (ETH)	2:24.40		FA
2	2	Hamza Driouch (QAT)	2:24.51		FA
3	2	Žan Rudolf (SLO)	2:24.63	PB	FA
4	1	Charlie Grice (GBR)	2:24.74		FA
5	1	Abdelhadi Labali (MAR)	2:25.23		FA
6	2	Mark English (IRL)	2:25.39		FA
7	2	Chuchu Jorjo (ERI)	2:25.40		FA
8	2	Anthonio Mascoll (BAR)	2:25.43		FA
9	1	Joseilton Cunha (BRA)	2:25.49	PB	FA
10	1	Elnazer Abdelrahman (SUD)	2:25.54		FA
11	1	Ahmed Mansour (EGY)	2:25.55		FA
12	1	Patrick Nibafasha (BDI)	2:27.26		FB
13	2	Rick Whitehead (AUS)	2:27.81	PB	FB
14	1	Indunil Herath (SRI)	2:30.83	PB	FB
15	1	Alejandro Peirano (CHI)	2:31.96		FB
16	2	Zachary Ryan Devaraj (SIN)	2:32.27	PB	FB
17	2	Abdulahi Kulow (SOM)	2:36.17		FB
18	1	Nour Aldin Hammoda (PLE)	2:36.67	PB	FB
19	2	Nelson Reis (ANG)	2:37.09		FB
20	1	Brad Mathas (NZL)	2:44.64		FB
	2	Koki Takada (JPN)	DSQ		FB

=== Finals ===
==== Final B ====
Rank	Athlete	Time	Notes
12	Patrick Nibafasha (BDI)	2:27.16	PB
13	Rick Whitehead (AUS)	2:27.20	PB
14	Indunil Herath (SRI)	2:27.57	PB
15	Alejandro Peirano (CHI)	2:28.58	PB
16	Koki Takada (JPN)	2:29.29	
17	Zachary Ryan Devaraj (SIN)	2:31.75	PB
18	Nelson Reis (ANG)	2:33.74	PB
19	Brad Mathas (NZL)	2:34.47	PB
20	Abdulahi Kulow (SOM)	2:34.47	
	Nour Aldin Hammoda (PLE)	DNS	

==== Final A ====
Rank	Athlete	Time	Notes
1st place, gold medalist(s)	Mohammed Geleto (ETH)	2:19.54	PB
2nd place, silver medalist(s)	Hamza Driouch (QAT)	2:21.25	
3rd place, bronze medalist(s)	Charlie Grice (GBR)	2:21.85	PB
4	Chuchu Jorjo (ERI)	2:22.00	
5	Joseilton Cunha (BRA)	2:24.14	PB
6	Ahmed Mansour (EGY)	2:24.22	
7	Žan Rudolf (SLO)	2:24.24	PB
8	Mark English (IRL)	2:24.95	
9	Elnazer Abdelrahman (SUD)	2:29.79	
10	Anthonio Mascoll (BAR)	2:37.14	
	Abdelhadi Labali (MAR)	DSQ	
