= Kenya at the 2010 Summer Youth Olympics =

- IOC code: KEN
- NOC: National Olympic Committee of Kenya

in Singapore
- Competitors: 10 in 3 sports
- Flag bearer: William Mbevi Mutunga
- Medals Ranked 18th: Gold 3 Silver 0 Bronze 3 Total 6

Summer Youth Olympics appearances
- 2010; 2014; 2018

Kenya participated in the 2010 Summer Youth Olympics in Singapore.

The planned Kenyan squad consisted of 10 athletes competing in 3 sports: Aquatics (Swimming), Athletics and Sailing.

== Medalists ==
Medal	Name	Sport	Event	Date
Gold	Gladys Chesir	Athletics	Girls' 3000m	22 Aug
Gold	Virginia Nyambura	Athletics	Girls' 2000m Steeplechase	23 Aug
Gold	Peter Matheka Mutuku	Athletics	Boys' 2000m Steeplechase	23 Aug
Bronze	Alfas Kishoyan	Athletics	Boys' 400m	21 Aug
Bronze	Damaris Muthee	Athletics	Girls' 1000m	23 Aug
Bronze	William Mbevi Mutunga	Athletics	Boys' 400m Hurdles	23 Aug

== Athletics ==
=== Boys ===
Track and Road Events

Athletes	Event	Qualification		Final	
Athletes	Event	Result	Rank	Result	Rank
Alphas Kishoyian	Boys’ 400m	47.79	6 Q	47.24	Bronze medal
Josphat Kiprop Kiptis	Boys’ 3000m	8:14.08	5 Q	DSQ	
William Mbevi Mutunga	Boys’ 400m Hurdles	53.08	6 Q	51.23	Bronze medal
Peter Matheka	Boys’ 2000m Steeplechase	5:38.72	2 Q	5:37.63	Gold medal
Tinashe Samuel Mutanga (ZIM); Okeudo Jonathan Nmaju (NGR); Alphas Kishoyian (KEN); Ruan Greyling (RSA)	Boys’ Medley Relay			1:53.45	4

=== Girls ===
Track and Road Events

Athletes	Event	Qualification		Final	
Athletes	Event	Result	Rank	Result	Rank
Damaris Muthee	Girls’ 1000m	2:47.09	7 Q	2:45.42	Bronze medal
Gladys Chesir	Girls’ 3000m	9:25.44	1 Q	9:13.58	Gold medal
Virginia Nyambura	Girls’ 2000m Steeplechase	6:42.40	1 Q	6:29.97	Gold medal

== Sailing ==
One Person Dinghy

Athlete	Event	Race												Points	Rank
Athlete	Event	1	2	3	4	5	6	7	8	9	10	11	M*	Points	Rank
Lara Kiran Granier	Girls' Byte CII	31	~~32~~	30	28	30	24	~~32~~	31	31	30	30	30	295	32

== Swimming ==
Athletes	Event	Heat		Semifinal		Final	
Athletes	Event	Time	Position	Time	Position	Time	Position
David Buruchara	Boys’ 50m Freestyle	25.75	31	Did not advance			
David Buruchara	Boys’ 100m Freestyle	58.17	47	Did not advance			
Sylvia Tanya Brunlehna	Girls’ 50m Freestyle	28.55	38	Did not advance			
Sylvia Tanya Brunlehna	Girls’ 50m Backstroke	32.90	18	Did not advance			
