= Mauritania at the 2010 Summer Youth Olympics =

- IOC code: MTN
- NOC: Comité National Mauritanien

in Singapore
- Competitors: 4 in 1 sport
- Flag bearer: Saleck Khattat

Summer Youth Olympics appearances
- 2010; 2014; 2018

Mauritania competed at the 2010 Summer Youth Olympics, the inaugural Youth Olympic Games, held in Singapore from 14 August to 26 August 2010.

== Athletics ==
=== Boys ===
Track and Road Events

Athletes	Event	Qualification		Final	
Athletes	Event	Result	Rank	Result	Rank
Mohamed Ould Medhadtt	Boys’ 100m	11.97	28 qD	DNS	
Saleck Khattat	Boys’ 3000m	DSQ qB		DNS	

=== Girls ===
Track and Road Events

Athletes	Event	Qualification		Final	
Athletes	Event	Result	Rank	Result	Rank
Aichetou Kone M Bodj	Girls’ 200m	28.86	17 qC	DNS	
Aicha Fall	Girls’ 1000m	3:38.36	29 qB	DNS	
