= Eritrea at the 2010 Summer Youth Olympics =

- IOC code: ERI
- NOC: Eritrean National Olympic Committee

in Singapore
- Competitors: 7 in 2 sports
- Flag bearer: Chuchu Jorjo
- Medals Ranked 48th: Gold 1 Silver 0 Bronze 1 Total 2

Summer Youth Olympics appearances
- 2010; 2014; 2018

Eritrea participated in the 2010 Summer Youth Olympics in Singapore.

== Medalists ==
Medal	Name	Sport	Event	Date
Gold	Abrar Osman	Athletics	Boys' 3000m	22 Aug
Bronze	Samrawit Mengisteab	Athletics	Girls' 3000m	22 Aug

== Athletics ==
=== Boys ===
Track and Road Events

Athletes	Event	Qualification		Final	
Athletes	Event	Result	Rank	Result	Rank
Chuchu Jorjo	Boys’ 1000m	2:25.40	7 Q	2:22.00	4
Abrar Osman	Boys’ 3000m	8:12.80	2 Q	8:07.24	Gold medal

=== Girls ===
Track and Road Events

Athletes	Event	Qualification		Final	
Athletes	Event	Result	Rank	Result	Rank
Samrawit Mengisteab	Girls’ 3000m	9:43.25	4 Q	9:33.53	Bronze medal

== Cycling ==
Cross Country

Athlete	Event	Time	Rank	Points
Samuel Akelom Gebremedhin	Boys’ Cross Country	-4LAP	29	72
Senait Araya Debesay	Girls’ Cross Country	DNS		55

Time Trial

Athlete	Event	Time	Rank	Points
Haben Ghebretinsae	Boys’ Time Trial	4:27.74	26	30
Senait Araya Debesay	Girls’ Time Trial	3:44.35	23	40

BMX

Athlete	Event	Seeding Round		Quarterfinals							Semifinals							Final		
Athlete	Event	Seeding Round		Run 1		Run 2		Run 3		Rank	Run 1		Run 2		Run 3		Rank	Final		
Athlete	Event	Time	Rank	Time	Rank	Time	Rank	Time	Rank	Rank	Time	Rank	Time	Rank	Time	Rank	Rank	Time	Rank	Points
Yonas Kidane Merese	Boys’ BMX	DNS		did not advance																72
Senait Araya Debesay	Girls’ BMX	DNS		did not advance																40

Road Race

Athlete	Event	Time	Rank	Points
Samuel Akelom Gebremedhin	Boys’ Road Race	1:08:21	51	67*
Haben Ghebretinsae	Boys’ Road Race	1:11:39	53	
Yonas Kidane Merese	Boys’ Road Race	1:16:55	74	

Overall

Team	Event	Cross Country Pts		Time Trial Pts		BMX Pts		Road Race Pts	Total	Rank
Team	Event	Boys	Girls	Boys	Girls	Boys	Girls	Road Race Pts	Total	Rank
Senait Araya Debesay; Samuel Akelom Gebremedhin; Haben Ghebretinsae; Yonas Kidane Merese	Mixed Team	72	55	30	40	72	40	67*	376	32

- * Received -5 for finishing road race with all three racers
