= Burkina Faso at the 2010 Summer Youth Olympics =

- IOC code: BUR
- NOC: Comité National Olympique et des Sports Burkinabè

in Singapore
- Competitors: 3 in 3 sports
- Flag bearer: Lamine Bagayogo
- Medals: Gold 0 Silver 0 Bronze 0 Total 0

Summer Youth Olympics appearances
- 2010; 2014; 2018

Burkina Faso participated in the 2010 Summer Youth Olympics in Singapore.

The Burkina Faso team consisted of 3 athletes competing in 3 sports: athletics, swimming and taekwondo.

== Athletics ==
Note: The athletes who do not have a "Q" next to their Qualification Rank advance to a non-medal ranking final.

=== Boys ===
Track and road events

Athletes	Event	Qualification		Final	
Athletes	Event	Result	Rank	Result	Rank
Ben Nombre	Boys' 100m	11.71	26 qD	11.48	24

== Swimming ==
Athletes	Event	Heat		Semifinal		Final	
Athletes	Event	Time	Position	Time	Position	Time	Position
Angelika Ouedraogo	Girls' 50m Freestyle	36.29	59	Did not advance			
Angelika Ouedraogo	Girls' 50m Breaststroke	42.21	23	Did not advance			

== Taekwondo ==
Men's

Athlete	Event	Preliminary	Quarterfinal	Semifinal	Final	Rank
Lamine Bagayogo	-63kg	BYE	Byeong Deok Seo (KOR); L RSC R3 1:05	Did not advance		5
