= Netherlands Antilles at the 2010 Summer Youth Olympics =

- IOC code: AHO
- NOC: Nederlands Antilliaans Olympisch Comité

in Singapore
- Competitors: 5 in 3 sports
- Flag bearer: Hensley Paulina
- Medals Ranked 84th: Gold 0 Silver 0 Bronze 1 Total 1

Summer Youth Olympics appearances
- 2010

Netherlands Antilles participated in the 2010 Summer Youth Olympics in Singapore.

The Netherlands Antilles team consisted of 5 athletes competing in 3 sports: athletics, sailing and swimming.

== Medalists ==
Medal	Name	Sport	Event	Date
Bronze	Just van Aanholt	Sailing	Boys' Byte CII	25 Aug

== Athletics ==
=== Boys ===
Track and road events

Athletes	Event	Qualification		Final	
Athletes	Event	Result	Rank	Result	Rank
Hensley Paulina	Boys' 200m	DNS qD		DNS	

=== Girls ===
Track and road events

Athletes	Event	Qualification		Final	
Athletes	Event	Result	Rank	Result	Rank
Vanessa Philbert	Girls' 1000m	2:57.83	12 qA	2:54.99	10

== Sailing ==
One Person Dinghy

Athlete	Event	Race												Points	Rank
Athlete	Event	1	2	3	4	5	6	7	8	9	10	11	M*	Points	Rank
Just van Aanholt	Boys' Byte CII	2	1	4	7	19	~~20~~	~~21~~	12	5	3	8	1	62	Bronze medal

== Swimming ==
Athletes	Event	Heat		Semifinal		Final	
Athletes	Event	Time	Rank	Time	Rank	Time	Rank
Perry Lindo	Boys' 50m Freestyle	24.22	21	Did not advance			
Perry Lindo	Boys' 50m Butterfly	26.50	12 Q	26.17	10	Did not advance	
Karlene Theodora	Girls' 50m Freestyle	28.36	35	Did not advance			
Karlene Theodora	Girls' 50m Backstroke	33.03	19	Did not advance			
