= Timor-Leste at the 2010 Summer Youth Olympics =

- IOC code: TLS
- NOC: National Olympic Committee of East Timor

in Singapore
- Competitors: 3 in 2 sports
- Flag bearer: Miloria Hanarisa De Arauju Santos
- Medals: Gold 0 Silver 0 Bronze 0 Total 0

Summer Youth Olympics appearances
- 2010; 2014; 2018

East Timor competed at the 2010 Summer Youth Olympics, the inaugural Youth Olympic Games, held in Singapore from 14 August to 26 August 2010.

== Athletics ==
=== Boys ===
Track and Road Events

Athletes	Event	Qualification		Final	
Athletes	Event	Result	Rank	Result	Rank
Ribeiro Pinto De Carvalho	Boys' 3000m	DSQ qB		DNS	

== Taekwondo ==
Girls

Athlete	Event	Preliminary	Quarterfinal	Semifinal	Final	Rank
Maria Silva	Girls' -44kg	Iryna Romoldanova (UKR); L 0-4, 0-7, 0-1	Did not advance			
Miloria Hanarisa De Arauju Santos	Girls' -63kg		Antonia Katheder (GER); L 1-12(RSC 2)	Did not advance		
