= Lesotho at the 2010 Summer Youth Olympics =

- IOC code: LES
- NOC: Lesotho National Olympic Committee

in Singapore
- Competitors: 4 in 3 sports
- Flag bearer: Ntšeke Setho

Summer Youth Olympics appearances
- 2010; 2014; 2018

Lesotho competed at the 2010 Summer Youth Olympics, the inaugural Youth Olympic Games, held in Singapore from 14 August to 26 August 2010.

== Athletics ==
=== Boys ===
Track and Road Events

Athletes	Event	Qualification		Final	
Athletes	Event	Result	Rank	Result	Rank
Tšehla Monethi	Boys’ 200m	22.38	15 qC	22.14	14

=== Girls ===
Track and Road Events

Athletes	Event	Qualification		Final	
Athletes	Event	Result	Rank	Result	Rank
Mpho Cecilia	Girls’ 3000m	DSQ qB		10:45.40	16

== Swimming ==
Athletes	Event	Heat		Semifinal		Final	
Athletes	Event	Time	Position	Time	Position	Time	Position
Ntšeke Setho	Boys’ 50m Breaststroke	36.56	16 Q	35.57	15	Did not advance	
Ntšeke Setho	Boys’ 100m Breaststroke	1:24.66	29	Did not advance			

== Taekwondo ==
Athlete	Event	Preliminary	Quarterfinal	Semifinal	Final	Rank
Lineo Machobane	Girls' -44kg	BYE	Anastasia Valueva (RUS); L DSQ	did not advance		5
