= Sudan at the 2010 Summer Youth Olympics =

- IOC code: SUD
- NOC: Sudan Olympic Committee

in Singapore
- Competitors: 8 in 2 sports
- Flag bearer: Muram Ali

Summer Youth Olympics appearances
- 2010; 2014; 2018

Sudan competed at the 2010 Summer Youth Olympics, the inaugural Youth Olympic Games, held in Singapore from 14 August to 26 August 2010.

== Athletics ==
=== Boys ===
Track and Road Events

Athletes	Event	Qualification		Final	
Athletes	Event	Result	Rank	Result	Rank
Sadam Elnour	Boys’ 400m	47.37	3 Q	47.32	4
Elnazer Abdelrahman	Boys’ 1000m	2:25.54	10 Q	2:29.79	9
Abdelmunaim Adam	Boys’ 3000m	8:33.03	13 qB	8:27.19	12
Ali Mohamed	Boys’ 400m Hurdles	54.38	11 qB	54.57	10
Yousif Daifalla	Boys’ 2000m Steeplechase	5:56.46	6 Q	5:45.84	5

=== Girls ===
Track and Road Events

Athletes	Event	Qualification		Final	
Athletes	Event	Result	Rank	Result	Rank
Tasabih Elsayed	Girls’ 400m Hurdles	DSQ qB		1:01.13	9

== Rowing ==
Athlete	Event	Heats		Repechage		Semifinals		Final		Overall Rank
Athlete	Event	Time	Rank	Time	Rank	Time	Rank	Time	Rank	Overall Rank
Musab Badawi	Boys' Single Sculls	4:04.73	6 QR	4:15.44	5 QC/D	4:21.74	4 QD	4:22.65	3	20
Muram Ali	Girls' Single Sculls	5:12.05	5 QR	DNF	QC/D	5:38.81	5 QD	5:29.10	4	21
