= Rwanda at the 2010 Summer Youth Olympics =

- IOC code: RWA
- NOC: Comité National Olympique et Sportif du Rwanda

in Singapore
- Competitors: 4 in 3 sports
- Flag bearer: Haziza Matusi

Summer Youth Olympics appearances
- 2010; 2014; 2018

Rwanda competed at the 2010 Summer Youth Olympics, the inaugural Youth Olympic Games, held in Singapore from 14 August to 26 August 2010.

== Athletics ==
=== Boys ===
Track and Road Events

Athletes	Event	Qualification		Final	
Athletes	Event	Result	Rank	Result	Rank
Potien Ntawuyirushintege	Boys’ 3000m	8:17.99	11 Q	8:14.59	8

=== Girls ===
Track and Road Events

Athletes	Event	Qualification		Final	
Athletes	Event	Result	Rank	Result	Rank
Jacqueline Murekatete	Girls’ 3000m	DSQ qB		9:55.83	11

== Boxing ==
Boys

Athlete	Event	Preliminaries	Semifinals	Final	Rank
Haziza Matusi	Light Flyweight (48kg)	Zohidjon Hoorboyev (UZB); L 1-7	Did not advance	5th Place Bout; Vadzim Kirylenka (BLR); L wd	6

== Swimming ==
Athletes	Event	Heat		Semifinal		Final	
Athletes	Event	Time	Position	Time	Position	Time	Position
Marie Claudine Iradukunda	Girls’ 50m Freestyle	39.62	60	Did not advance			
