= Chad at the 2010 Summer Youth Olympics =

- IOC code: CHA
- NOC: Comité Olympique et Sportif Tchadien

in Singapore
- Competitors: 2 in 1 sport
- Flag bearer: Mitsou Minda

Summer Youth Olympics appearances
- 2010; 2014; 2018

Chad competed at the 2010 Summer Youth Olympics, the inaugural Youth Olympic Games, held in Singapore from 14 August to 26 August 2010.

== Athletics ==
=== Boys ===
Track and road events

Athletes	Event	Qualification		Final	
Athletes	Event	Result	Rank	Result	Rank
Djato Emmanuel	Boys' 400m	DSQ qD		51.03	21

=== Girls ===
Track and Road Events

Athletes	Event	Qualification		Final	
Athletes	Event	Result	Rank	Result	Rank
Mitsou Minda	Girls’ 1000m	3:11.15	22 qB	3:04.35	23
