= Nepal at the 2010 Summer Youth Olympics =

- IOC code: NEP
- NOC: Nepal Olympic Committee

in Singapore
- Competitors: 4 in 2 sports
- Flag bearer: Tilak Ram Tharu
- Medals: Gold 0 Silver 0 Bronze 0 Total 0

Summer Youth Olympics appearances
- 2010; 2014; 2018

Nepal competed at the 2010 Summer Youth Olympics, the inaugural Youth Olympic Games, held in Singapore from 14 to 26 August 2010.

== Athletics ==
=== Boys ===
Track and Road Events

Athletes	Event	Qualification		Final	
Athletes	Event	Result	Rank	Result	Rank
Tilak Ram Tharu	Boys' 100m	11.21	16 qB	DNS	

=== Girls ===
Track and Road Events

Athletes	Event	Qualification		Final	
Athletes	Event	Result	Rank	Result	Rank
Manisha Adhikari	Girls’ 400m	1:03.49	22 qD	DNS	
Bishwa Rupa Budha	Girls’ 3000m	10:41.42	14 qB	DNS	

== Taekwondo ==
Athlete	Event	Preliminary	Quarterfinal	Semifinal	Final	Rank
Ranjan Shrestha	Boys' -55kg	Nursultan Mamayev (KAZ); L 3-8	did not advance			9
