= Mali at the 2010 Summer Youth Olympics =

- IOC code: MLI
- NOC: Comité National Olympique et Sportif du Mali

in Singapore
- Competitors: 7 in 3 sports
- Flag bearer: Sadio Konate

Summer Youth Olympics appearances
- 2010; 2014; 2018

Mali competed at the 2010 Summer Youth Olympics, the inaugural Youth Olympic Games, held in Singapore from 14 August to 26 August 2010.

== Athletics ==
=== Boys ===
Track and Road Events

Athletes	Event	Qualification		Final	
Athletes	Event	Result	Rank	Result	Rank
Fousseyni Tamboura	Boys’ 400m	50.96	17 qC	51.01	18

=== Girls ===
Track and Road Events

Athletes	Event	Qualification		Final	
Athletes	Event	Result	Rank	Result	Rank
Hawa Diarra	Girls’ 100m	13.15	24 qD	13.16	21

== Basketball ==
Girls

Squad List	Event	Group Stage		Placement Stage			Rank
Squad List	Event	Group C	Rank	9th-16th	13th-16th	13th-14th	Rank
Sadio Konate (C); M'bamakan Kanoute; Aissata Toure; Fanta Charles Guindo	Girls' Basketball	Czech Republic; L 8-33	4	Italy; L 18-29	Ivory Coast; W 17-13	Czech Republic; L 12-32	14
Sadio Konate (C); M'bamakan Kanoute; Aissata Toure; Fanta Charles Guindo	Girls' Basketball	Thailand; W 23-18	4	Italy; L 18-29	Ivory Coast; W 17-13	Czech Republic; L 12-32	14
Sadio Konate (C); M'bamakan Kanoute; Aissata Toure; Fanta Charles Guindo	Girls' Basketball	China; L 12-32	4	Italy; L 18-29	Ivory Coast; W 17-13	Czech Republic; L 12-32	14
Sadio Konate (C); M'bamakan Kanoute; Aissata Toure; Fanta Charles Guindo	Girls' Basketball	Brazil; L 14-34	4	Italy; L 18-29	Ivory Coast; W 17-13	Czech Republic; L 12-32	14

== Taekwondo ==
Athlete	Event	Preliminary	Quarterfinal	Semifinal	Final	Rank
Kadiatou Diallo	Girls' -63kg	Rea Budic (CRO); L RSC R1 0:35	did not advance			9
