= Dominica at the 2010 Summer Youth Olympics =

- IOC code: DMA
- NOC: Dominica Olympic Committee

in Singapore
- Competitors: 3 in 1 sport
- Flag bearer: Simon Lawrence

Summer Youth Olympics appearances
- 2010; 2014; 2018

Dominica competed at the 2010 Summer Youth Olympics, the inaugural Youth Olympic Games, held in Singapore from 14 August to 26 August 2010.

== Athletics ==
=== Boys ===
Track and road events

Athletes	Event	Qualification		Final	
Athletes	Event	Result	Rank	Result	Rank
Simon Lawrence	Boys' 400m	48.82	12 qB	49.29	15

=== Girls ===
Track and road events

Athletes	Event	Qualification		Final	
Athletes	Event	Result	Rank	Result	Rank
Tabique Lockhart	Girls' 400m	58.76	17 qC	59.44	19
Kaysanda Alexander	Girls' 1000m	3:21.10	26 qB	3:14.91	28
