= Tanzania at the 2010 Summer Youth Olympics =

- IOC code: TAN
- NOC: Tanzania Olympic Committee

in Singapore
- Competitors: 4 in 2 sports
- Flag bearer: Mariam Foum
- Medals: Gold 0 Silver 0 Bronze 0 Total 0

Summer Youth Olympics appearances
- 2010; 2014; 2018; 2026

Tanzania competed at the 2010 Summer Youth Olympics, the inaugural Youth Olympic Games, held in Singapore from 14 August to 26 August 2010.

== Athletics ==
=== Boys ===
Track and Road Events

Athletes	Event	Qualification		Final	
Athletes	Event	Result	Rank	Result	Rank
Mwita Kopiro Marwa	Boys’ 3000m	8:14.60	7 Q	8:11.37	6

=== Girls ===
Track and Road Events

Athletes	Event	Qualification		Final	
Athletes	Event	Result	Rank	Result	Rank
Neema Emanuel Sule	Girls’ 3000m	10:29.07	13 qB	10:22.73	14

== Swimming ==
Athletes	Event	Heat		Semifinal		Final	
Athletes	Event	Time	Position	Time	Position	Time	Position
Adam David Kitururu	Boys’ 50m Freestyle	29.91	46	Did not advance			
Mariam Foum	Girls’ 50m Freestyle	30.51	47	Did not advance			
