= Somalia at the 2010 Summer Youth Olympics =

- IOC code: SOM
- NOC: Somali Olympic Committee

in Singapore
- Competitors: 2 (1 man, 1 woman) in 1 sport
- Flag bearer: Abdulahi Kulow
- Medals: Gold 0 Silver 0 Bronze 0 Total 0

Summer Youth Olympics appearances
- 2010; 2014; 2018

Somalia competed at the 2010 Summer Youth Olympics, the inaugural Youth Olympic Games, held in Singapore from 14 August to 26 August 2010. The nation was represented by the Somali Olympic Committee, which sent a total of two athletes to compete in one sport, athletics. The flagbearer at the opening ceremony for the nation was athlete Abdulahi Kulow. Somalia's Olympic team was one of the 106 that did not win a single medal at the Games.

== Athletics ==
Athletics was the only sport Somalia participated in. All two athletes did not make it to the medal final, but instead entered the non-medal ranking finals to compete with other athletes who similarly did not make the mark.

=== Boys ===
Track and Road Events

Athletes	Event	Qualification		Final	
Athletes	Event	Result	Rank	Result	Rank
Abdulahi Kulow	Boys’ 1000m	2:36.17	17 qB	2:34.47	19

=== Girls ===
Track and Road Events

Athletes	Event	Qualification		Final	
Athletes	Event	Result	Rank	Result	Rank
Hani Abdirahman Muse	Girls’ 400m	DNF qD		DNS	

== See also ==
- Somalia at the Olympics
