= Burundi at the 2010 Summer Youth Olympics =

- IOC code: BDI
- NOC: Comité National Olympique du Burundi

in Singapore
- Competitors: 4 in 1 sport
- Flag bearer: Zabulon Ndikumana

Summer Youth Olympics appearances
- 2010; 2014; 2018

Burundi competed at the 2010 Summer Youth Olympics, the inaugural Youth Olympic Games, held in Singapore from 14 August to 26 August 2010.

== Athletics ==
=== Boys ===
Track and Road Events

| Athletes | Event | Qualification | | Final | |
| Athletes | Event | Result | Rank | Result | Rank |
|---|---|---|---|---|---|
| Patrick Nibafasha | Boys’ 1000m | 2:27.26 | 12 qB | 2:27.16 | 11 |
| Zabulon Ndikumana | Boys’ 3000m | 8:50.77 | 15 qB | 8:28.76 | 13 |

=== Girls ===
Track and Road Events

| Athletes | Event | Qualification | | Final | |
| Athletes | Event | Result | Rank | Result | Rank |
|---|---|---|---|---|---|
| Francine Bukuru | Girls’ 1000m | 3:14.65 | 24 qB | 3:12.59 | 26 |
| Devote Inamahoro | Girls’ 3000m | DSQ qB | | 10:15.49 | 13 |
