= Djibouti at the 2010 Summer Youth Olympics =

- IOC code: DJI
- NOC: Comité National Olympique Djiboutien

in Singapore
- Competitors: 4 in 2 sports
- Flag bearer: Abdourahman Osman
- Medals: Gold 0 Silver 0 Bronze 0 Total 0

Summer Youth Olympics appearances
- 2010; 2014; 2018

Djibouti participated in the 2010 Summer Youth Olympics in Singapore.

The Djibouti team consisted of 4 athletes competing in 2 sports: athletics and swimming.

== Athletics ==
=== Boys ===
Track and Road Events

Athletes	Event	Qualification		Final	
Athletes	Event	Result	Rank	Result	Rank
Aboubaker Sougueh Houffaneh	Boys’ 3000m	DNF qB		DNS	

=== Girls ===
Track and Road Events

Athletes	Event	Qualification		Final	
Athletes	Event	Result	Rank	Result	Rank
Saredo Abdi	Girls’ 1000m	3:19.46	25 qB	DNS	
Zourha Ali	Girls’ 3000m	DNF qB		DNS	

== Swimming ==
Athletes	Event	Heat		Semifinal		Final	
Athletes	Event	Time	Position	Time	Position	Time	Position
Abdourahman Osman	Boys’ 50m Freestyle	28.89	43	Did not advance			
Abdourahman Osman	Boys’ 100m Freestyle	DNS		Did not advance			
