= Federated States of Micronesia at the 2010 Summer Youth Olympics =

- IOC code: FSM
- NOC: Federated States of Micronesia National Olympic Committee

in Singapore
- Competitors: 3 in 2 sports
- Flag bearer: Dionisio Augustine
- Medals: Gold 0 Silver 0 Bronze 0 Total 0

Summer Youth Olympics appearances
- 2010; 2014; 2018

The Federated States of Micronesia participated in the 2010 Summer Youth Olympics in Singapore.

The Micronesian squad consisted of 3 athletes competing in 2 sports: aquatics (swimming) and athletics.

== Athletics ==
=== Girls ===
Track and Road Events

| Athletes | Event | Qualification | | Final | |
| Athletes | Event | Result | Rank | Result | Rank |
|---|---|---|---|---|---|
| Reloliza Saimon | Girls’ 400m | 1:12.41 | 25 qD | 1:07.12 | 22 |

== Swimming ==
| Athletes | Event | Heat | | Semifinal | | Final | |
| Athletes | Event | Time | Position | Time | Position | Time | Position |
|---|---|---|---|---|---|---|---|
| Dionisio Augustine | Boys’ 50m Freestyle | 27.32 | 39 | Did not advance | | | |
| Rayleen David | Girls’ 50m Freestyle | 32.32 | 55 | Did not advance | | | |
