= Cape Verde at the 2010 Summer Youth Olympics =

- IOC code: CPV
- NOC: Cape Verde Olympic Committee

in Singapore
- Competitors: 2 in 2 sports
- Flag bearer: Jacira Mendes
- Medals: Gold 0 Silver 0 Bronze 0 Total 0

Summer Youth Olympics appearances
- 2010; 2014; 2018

The Cape Verde participated in the 2010 Summer Youth Olympics in Singapore.

== Athletics ==
Note: The athletes who do not have a "Q" next to their Qualification Rank advance to a non-medal ranking final.

=== Boys ===
Track and road events

| Athletes | Event | Qualification | | Final | |
| Athletes | Event | Result | Rank | Result | Rank |
|---|---|---|---|---|---|
| Apollo Livamento | Boys' 100m | 12.25 | 33 qE | 12.24 | 30 |

== Taekwondo ==
| Athlete | Event | Preliminary | Quarterfinal | Semifinal | Final | Rank |
|---|---|---|---|---|---|---|
| Jacira Mendes | Girls' -49kg | Worawong Pongpanit (THA); L KO R1 0:38 | did not advance | | | 9 |
