= Antigua and Barbuda at the 2010 Summer Youth Olympics =

- IOC code: ANT
- NOC: The Antigua and Barbuda Olympic Association

in Singapore
- Competitors: 4 in 2 sports
- Flag bearer: Tahir Walsh
- Medals: Gold 0 Silver 0 Bronze 0 Total 0

Summer Youth Olympics appearances
- 2010; 2014; 2018

Antigua and Barbuda participated in the 2010 Summer Youth Olympics in Singapore.

The Antigua and Barbuda team consisted of 4 athletes competing in 2 sports: Athletics and Swimming.

== Athletics ==
=== Boys ===
Track and Road Events

Athletes	Event	Qualification		Final	
Athletes	Event	Result	Rank	Result	Rank
Tahir Walsh	Boys' 100m	10.89	5 Q	10.71	4
Jalil Salmon	Boys' 400m	53.55	21 qC	52.58	19

=== Girls ===
Track and Road Events

Athletes	Event	Qualification		Final	
Athletes	Event	Result	Rank	Result	Rank
Kenryca Shenika Francis	Girls’ 3000m	11:07.12	15 qB	11:11.11	17

== Swimming ==
Athletes	Event	Heat		Semifinal		Final	
Athletes	Event	Time	Position	Time	Position	Time	Position
Kareem Sandoval Valentine	Boys’ 50m Freestyle	29.42	44	Did not advance			
