= Aicha Fall =

Mauritanian middle-distance runner

Aicha Bilal Fall (born 31 December 1993) is a Mauritanian middle-distance runner who competed at the 2012 Summer Olympics in the women's 800 m event. She was born in Nouakchott, Mauritania.
