= 2010 Summer Youth Olympics =

Multi-sport event in Singapore

I Summer Youth Olympic Games
- The official "Spirit of Youth" emblem
- Location: Singapore
- Motto: Blazing the Trail
- Nations: 204
- Athletes: 3,524
- Events: 201 in 26 sports
- Opening: 14 August
- Closing: 26 August
- Opened by: President S. R. Nathan
- Closed by: IOC president Jacques Rogge
- Cauldron: Darren Choy
- Stadium: The Float at Marina Bay

The 2010 Summer Youth Olympics, (Note: (Chinese: 第一届夏季青年奥林匹克运动会; pinyin: Dì Yī Jiè Xiàjì Qīngnián Àolínpǐkè Yùndònghuì Tamil: 2010 கோடைக்கால இளையோர் ஒலிம்பிக் விளையாட்டுக்கள் 2010 Kōṭaikkāla Iḷaiyōr Olimpik Viḷaiyāṭṭukkaḷ Malay: Sukan Olimpik Belia Musim Panas 2010)) officially known as the I Summer Youth Olympic Games, and commonly known as Singapore 2010, were the inaugural edition of the Youth Olympic Games (YOG), an Olympic Games-based event for young athletes. Held in Singapore from 14 to 26 August 2010, it was the first International Olympic Committee–sanctioned event held in Southeast Asia. The Games featured about 3,600 athletes aged 14–18 from 204 nations, who competed in 201 events in 26 sports. No official medal tables were published, but the most successful nation was China, followed by Russia; host Singapore did not win any gold medals. Most features that are unique to the YOG, such as mixed-NOCs teams (comprising youths from different countries) and the Culture and Education Programme (CEP), made their debut at the 2010 Games.

Although the concept dates back to 1998, formal plans for the YOG were only first announced at the 119th IOC session on 6 July 2007. On 21 February 2008, Singapore was selected as the host city after defeating Moscow 53–44 in a postal vote by 105 International Olympic Committee (IOC) members. The Singapore Youth Olympic Games Organising Committee (SYOGOC) prepared eighteen competition venues and twelve training venues. The Float@Marina Bay hosted the opening and closing ceremonies and the Youth Olympic Village was located at Nanyang Technological University (NTU). The committee also selected Games mascots Lyo and Merly (a lion and a female merlion), the Spirit of Youth emblem (through a design competition) and the theme song "Everyone", performed by five singers representing each major continent, combining North and South America.

Online media, Asian newspapers and 166 television broadcasters provided extensive coverage of the Games. The torch relay, which began on 23 July 2010, comprised a thirteen-day world tour of five cities, each representing a continent, and a six-day domestic leg. Highlights of the opening and closing ceremonies include performances about Singaporean history and culture, a 32-metre (35 yd) Olympic cauldron, flags being brought onto stage and items featuring YOG symbols. The Games were marred by discrepancies in the budget and attendance figures, two wrestlers caught doping, a walkover in the taekwondo final and allegations that Bolivian footballers were overage.

== Bidding process ==
The concept of the YOG was developed in 1998 by Johann Rosenzopf in response to concerns over childhood obesity and declining youth participation in sports. IOC President Jacques Rogge formally announced plans for the YOG at the 119th IOC session in Guatemala City on 6 July 2007. Singapore, which had hosted the 117th session, made its first formal bid to host a multi-disciplinary sporting event of this magnitude. Positive factors in its bid included its high connectivity with the world, its youthfulness as an independent country, and its positive reputation for excellence and multiracial harmony. The city-state rolled out a high-publicity campaign which included being amongst the first to launch its official website, bid logo (despite IOC rules against bid logos) and a bid tagline "Blazing the Trail" on 16 October 2007. It also got the local population to support its bid, including an effort by students to collect 1 million signatures.

2010 Summer Youth Olympics bidding results
| City | Nation | Votes |
| Singapore | Singapore | 53 |
| Moscow | Russia | 44 |

Eleven cities expressed interest in hosting the Games, nine of which ultimately applied. Five cities amongst the nine were selected for the shortlist: Athens (Greece), Bangkok (Thailand), Moscow (Russia), Singapore, and Turin (Italy). The list was further shortened to two finalists, Singapore and Moscow. On 21 February 2008, Rogge announced that Singapore had won the postal vote 53–44 and was thus selected as the host for the Games.

There were concerns over whether two new venues that had been planned – a Youth Olympic Village and an equestrian complex – would be ready in time for the Games. A construction expert believed the US$423 million plan for an Olympic Village at the National University of Singapore (NUS) was feasible, and that the equestrian venue could be delivered on time. In spite of the expert's findings, the Youth Olympic Village at the NUS's University Town did run into difficulties owing to increasing construction costs. It was subsequently decided that existing student halls of residence at Nanyang Technological University in Jurong West would be used for the Olympic Village.

== Development and preparations ==
=== Organisation ===
The Singapore Youth Olympic Games Organising Committee (SYOGOC) was tasked with organising the inaugural Games. It was aided by a panel of advisors composed of Cabinet ministers and Senior Parliamentary Secretary Teo Ser Luck. In addition, an Inter-Ministry Committee was established with Niam Chiang Meng, Permanent Secretary, Ministry of Community Development, Youth and Sports as its chairman. Singapore also received some international support for the Games preparations. The People's Republic of China, host of the 2008 Summer Olympics, expressed its desire to assist Singapore in its preparations. Sebastian Coe, Lord Coe, Chairman of the London Organising Committee for the 2012 Summer Olympics, announced that members of his organising team, including coaches and administrators, planned to attend the event. The Bid Committee secured 4,310 guaranteed rooms in 36 hotels. The official hotel partner for the Games was Fairmont Singapore.

=== Costs ===
The IOC initially projected in 2007 that the Youth Olympic Games would cost US$30 million to stage. Singapore won its bid in 2008 with a budget of US$75.5 million (S$105 million) with strong government support. The budget was later increased to U$284 million (S$387 million), thrice the original amount, which the organisers attributed to major revisions in the scope and scale of the Games. Costs were increased for logistics and transport, security, and upgrades of various sports venues and technology. Financially, local companies received about 70%, or S$260 million, worth of contracts from the Games. Concerns over cost overruns were dismissed by SYOGOC Chairman Ng Ser Miang. The cost overruns was to become an issue that was raised by opposition parties during Singapore's 2011 general elections.

=== Venues and infrastructures ===
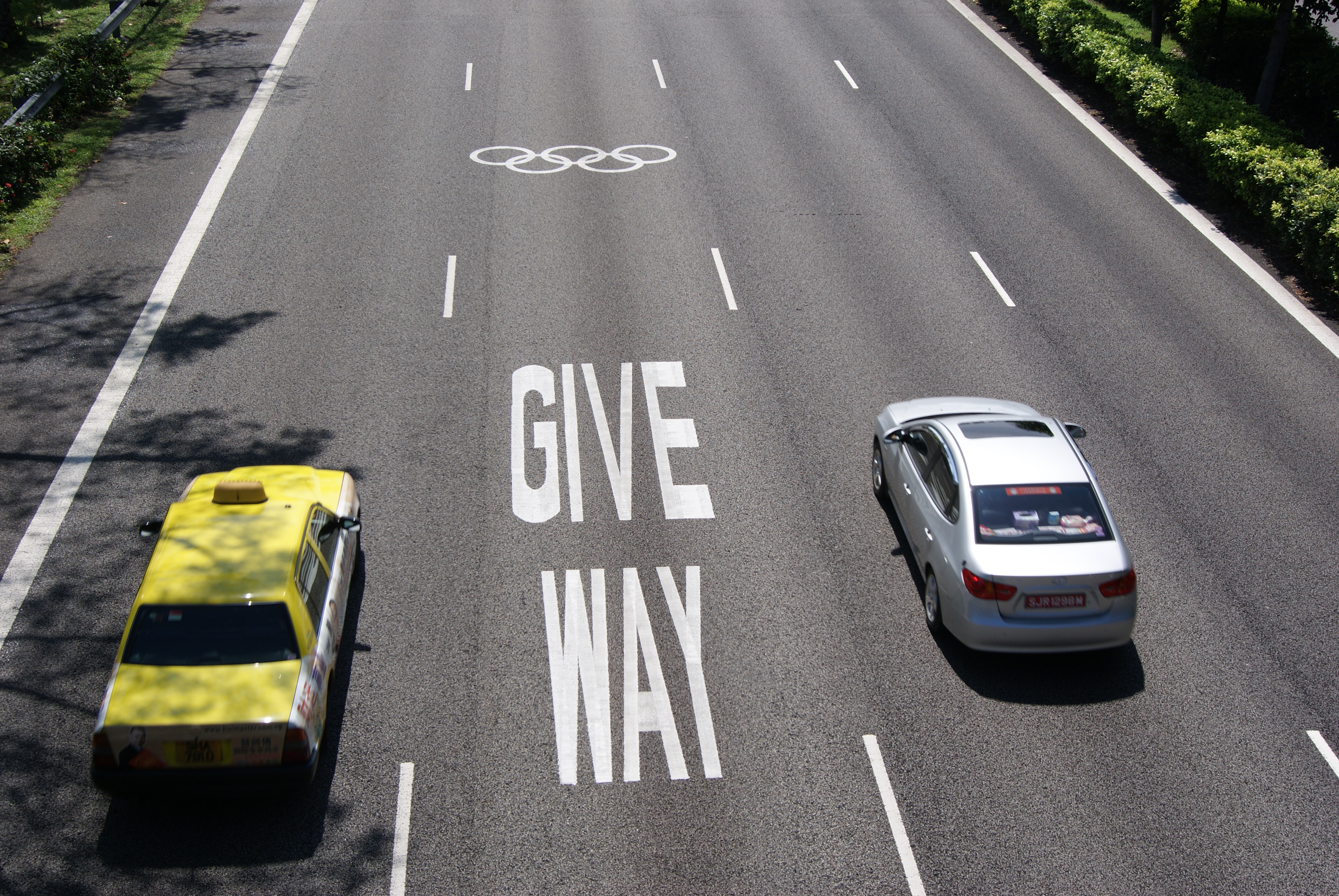
A Youth Olympic Lane along the Ayer Rajah Expressway in the direction of Tuas, near the National University of Singapore. These lanes were used by vehicles ferrying YOG athletes, and these vehicles must be given way to.

Eighteen competition venues were used at the Games. Events took place at 11 pre-existing venues, one new venue (the Singapore Turf Club Riding Centre), and six temporary venues that will be removed following the Games. Twelve venues were also set aside for training purposes. Certain venues such as the Singapore Indoor Stadium and The Float@Marina Bay were temporarily converted to host sports events, while Kallang Field was upgraded to be able to host the archery competition. The Float@Marina Bay, a floating stage, was the main stadium for the Games. Capable of seating 25,000 spectators, it hosted the opening ceremony on 14 August, was a venue for the cycling event, and also hosted the closing ceremony held on 26 August 2010.

All competition and non-competition venues were within 30 minutes of the Youth Olympic Village, the Main Media Centre (MMC) and the Olympic Family Hotels (OFH). An Event Transport Operations Centre (ETOC) managed all transport matters relating to the YOG, providing real-time travel information. A shuttle service linked all YOG venues for all accredited persons, who were also entitled to complimentary travel on public buses and the Mass Rapid Transit system. Youth Olympic Lanes were designated along key routes for faster access to all YOG venues.

The Youth Olympic Village (YOV) of the Games housed over 5,000 athletes and team officials for 18 days from 10 to 28 August 2010. Located in Nanyang Technological University (NTU), the YOV served as accommodation and a preparation point for the Games, and also hosted specially designed cultural and educational activities for athletes. On 7 June, it was announced that Parliamentary Secretary and SYOGOC advisor Teo Ser Luck, former national sprinter Canagasabai Kunalan and former national swimmer Joscelin Yeo had been appointed as the Village Mayor and Deputy Village Mayors respectively.

=== Torch relay ===
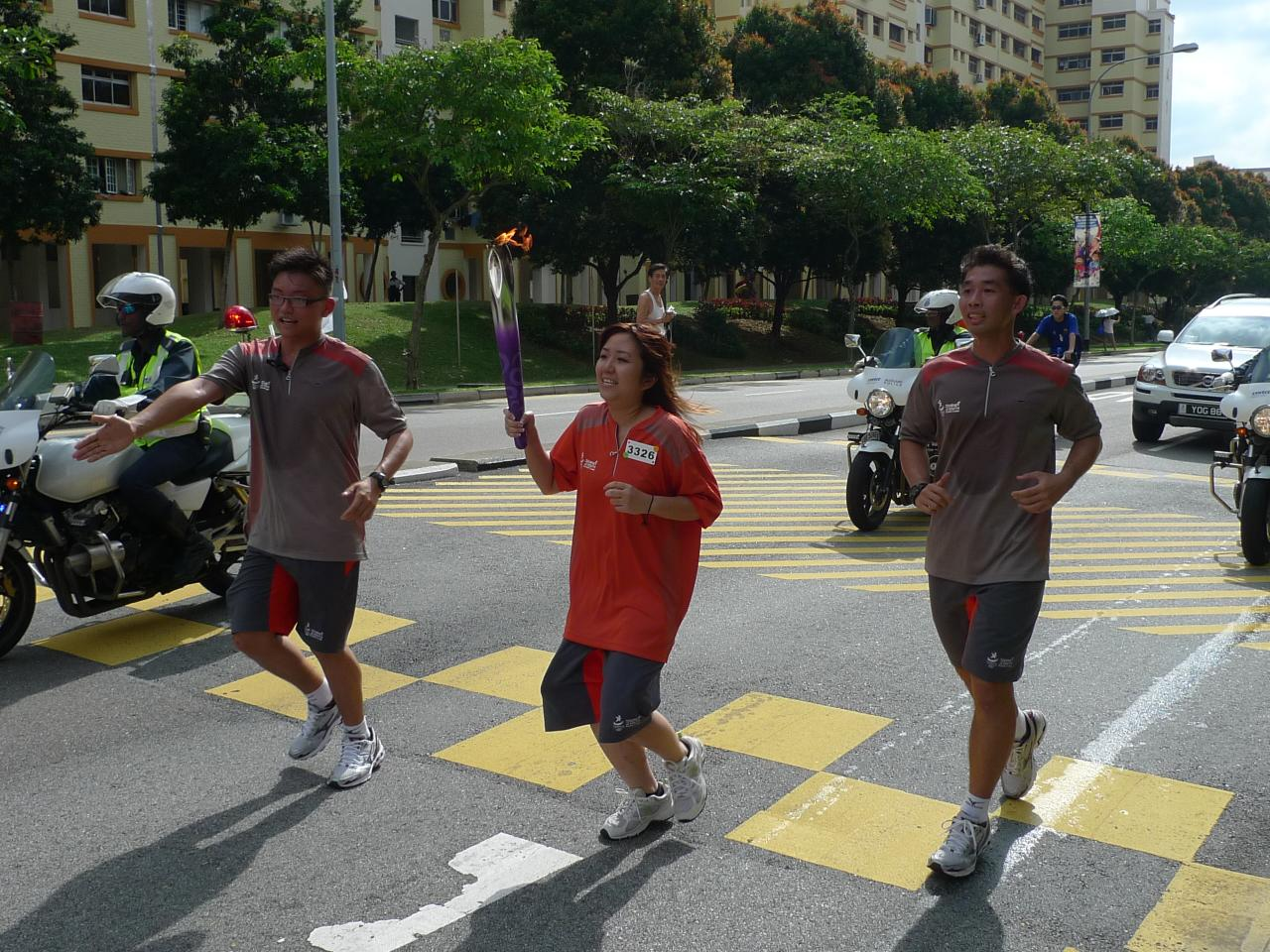
The torch relay in the northeast of Singapore on 10 August 2010

Plans for the Youth Olympic torch relay, dubbed the Journey of the Youth Olympic Flame (JYOF), were unveiled on 26 January 2010. The torch used was 60 cm (24 in) high, 5 to 8 centimetres (2.0 to 3.1 in) wide, and weighed 0.74 kg (1.6 lb). The flame was lit at Olympia in Greece on 23 July 2010 and travelled to five cities representing the continents Asia, Africa, Europe, Oceania and the Americas. The relay travelled through the following cities, dubbed the "Celebration Cities":

- Berlin, Germany
- Dakar, Senegal
- Mexico City, Mexico
- Auckland, New Zealand
- Seoul, South Korea

After spending 13 days on its world tour, the torch relay continued for another six days in Singapore. A portable cauldron at the Marina Bay Promenade was lit by Minister Mentor Lee Kuan Yew on 13 August at the end of the torch relay in Singapore.

== The Games ==
=== Opening ceremony ===
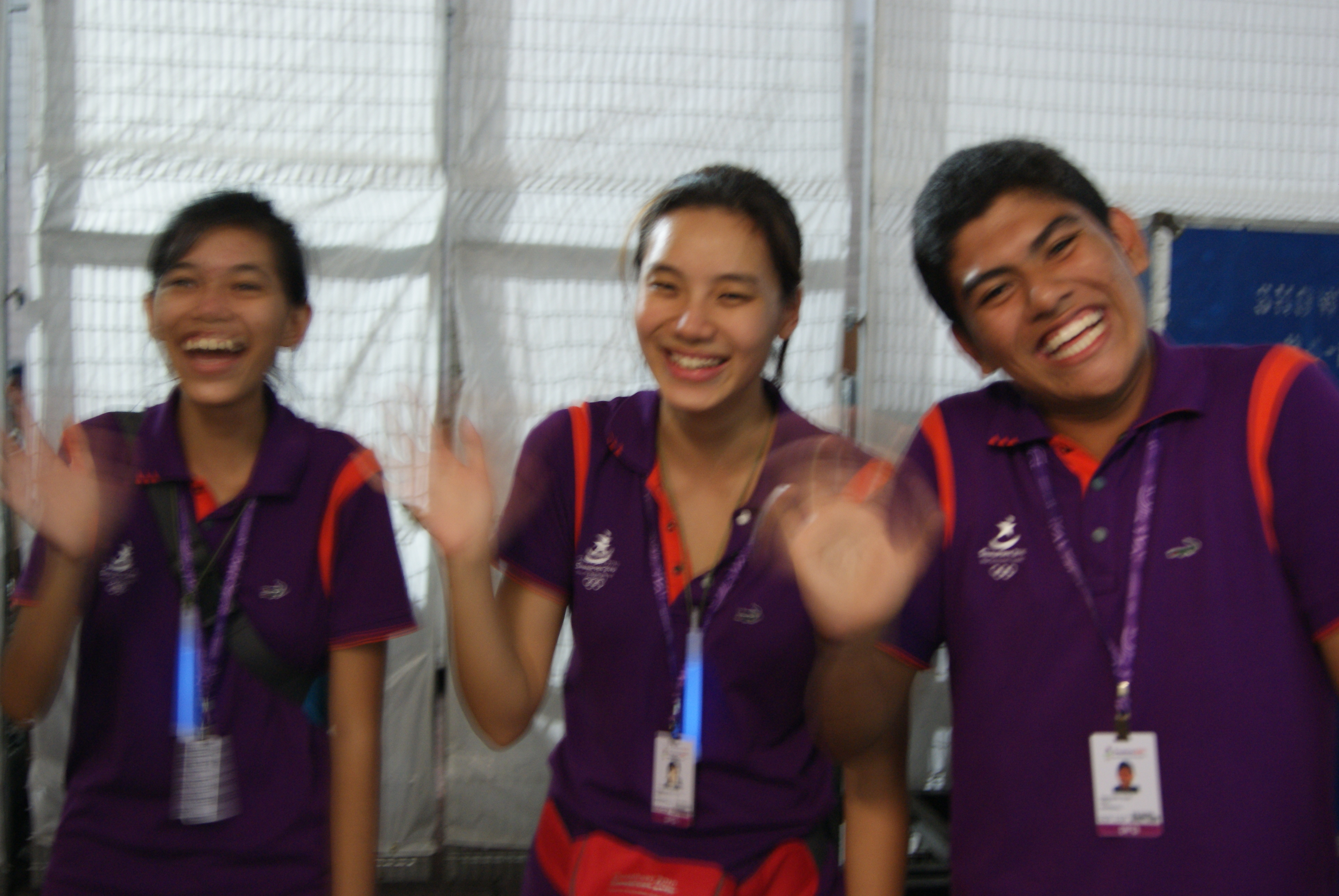
Volunteers at the opening ceremony

The opening ceremony of the Games was held on 14 August at The Float@Marina Bay, a floating stage near downtown Singapore. Approximately 27,000 spectators attended the event, which took place against a backdrop of the city's skyline. Event tickets cost between S$30 and S$200. The show, the largest ever held by the city, involved over 750 hours of rehearsals. Over 7,000 performers, mostly under the age of 18, took part in the ceremony. At the centre of the stage was the 32-metre (35 yd) tall Olympic cauldron designed by Randy Chan as a lighthouse. It was flanked by six giant LED displays, which stood behind a reflecting pool containing 200 t (7,100,000 oz) of water. Prime Minister of Singapore Lee Hsien Loong was present at the event.

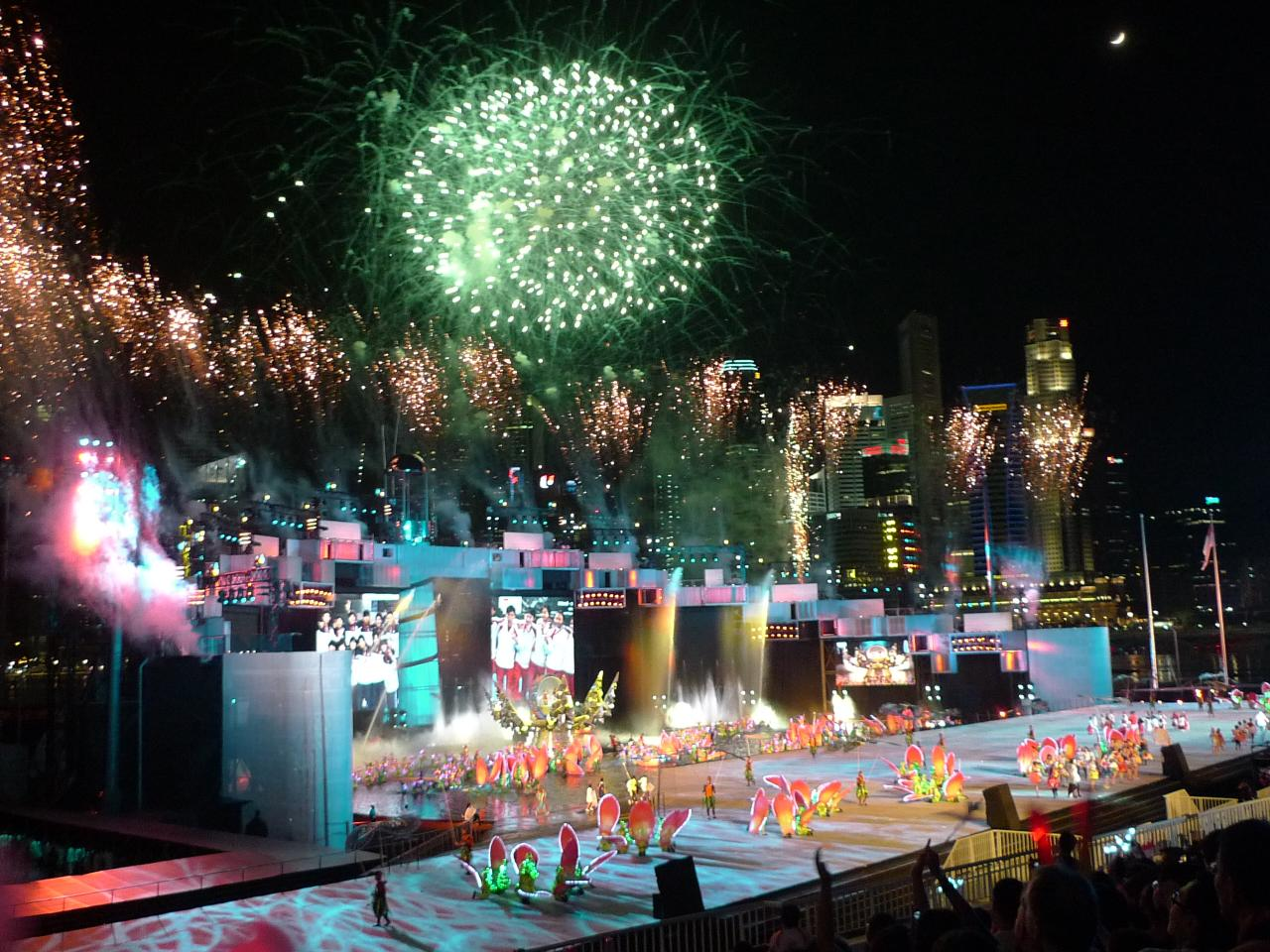
One of the segments of the opening ceremony

Following pre-show warm-up and a countdown led by children and young drummers, the show began proper at 20:10 hrs (UTC+8)—a reference to the year of the event—with a fireworks show, followed by a cultural segment titled "Selamat Datang" that featured Chinese, Malay and Indian performers. The segment ended with performances by homegrown artistes of Eurasian and Peranakan heritage, symbolising the mixture of tradition and modernity in Singapore. Audience members were greeted with pre-recorded messages from several Olympic ambassadors: Olympians Usain Bolt, Michael Phelps and Yelena Isinbayeva, members of the band Thirty Seconds to Mars, and actors Jackie Chan and Jet Li. The flag of Singapore entered the stage with the Deyi Military Band, who had won the Display Band of the Year Award and Best Drum Major of the Year Award in the Singapore Youth Festival Central Judging Display Band Competition 2010, performing "Five Stars Arising", and the national anthem while the flag was raised.

During the "Origins" segment on the city's history, performers entered the stage in freight containers to depict the arrival of the earliest immigrants. The ceremony continued with a dance performance featuring popular songs from the 1940s to the present era. A segment entitled "Monster" told the story of a young boxer who had to fight a giant monster. He summons his Silat warriors to fight against the monster, but they failed, as well as when he summons his Kalari warriors and Wushu warriors. But soon he overcomes his inner fears and defeats the giant monster. Singer Seah Wei Wen then performed "Across The Finish Line" composed by Mayuni Omar & Mathilda D Silva, in the centre of the reflecting pool. It was followed by "Playing with Fire", which featured the dragon as a symbol of courage, strength and wisdom. In this segment, 500 youth from Soka Gakkai Singapore participate to form from many fishes into a dragon. Reflecting the theme of global co-operation, members of the World Youth Orchestra of the Singapore Games performed an orchestral piece featuring various instruments from around the world. The orchestra was led by Darrell Ang, the young associate conductor of the Singapore Symphony Orchestra. The following segment, titled "Bud", depicted rain as a symbol of hope and rejuvenation. Ending the show segment of the ceremony were singers Marcus Lee of Ex-Dee and Lian Kim Selby, performing the song "A New Story", which was commissioned for the event. Their performance was accompanied by a fashion show organized by students from LASALLE College of the Arts.

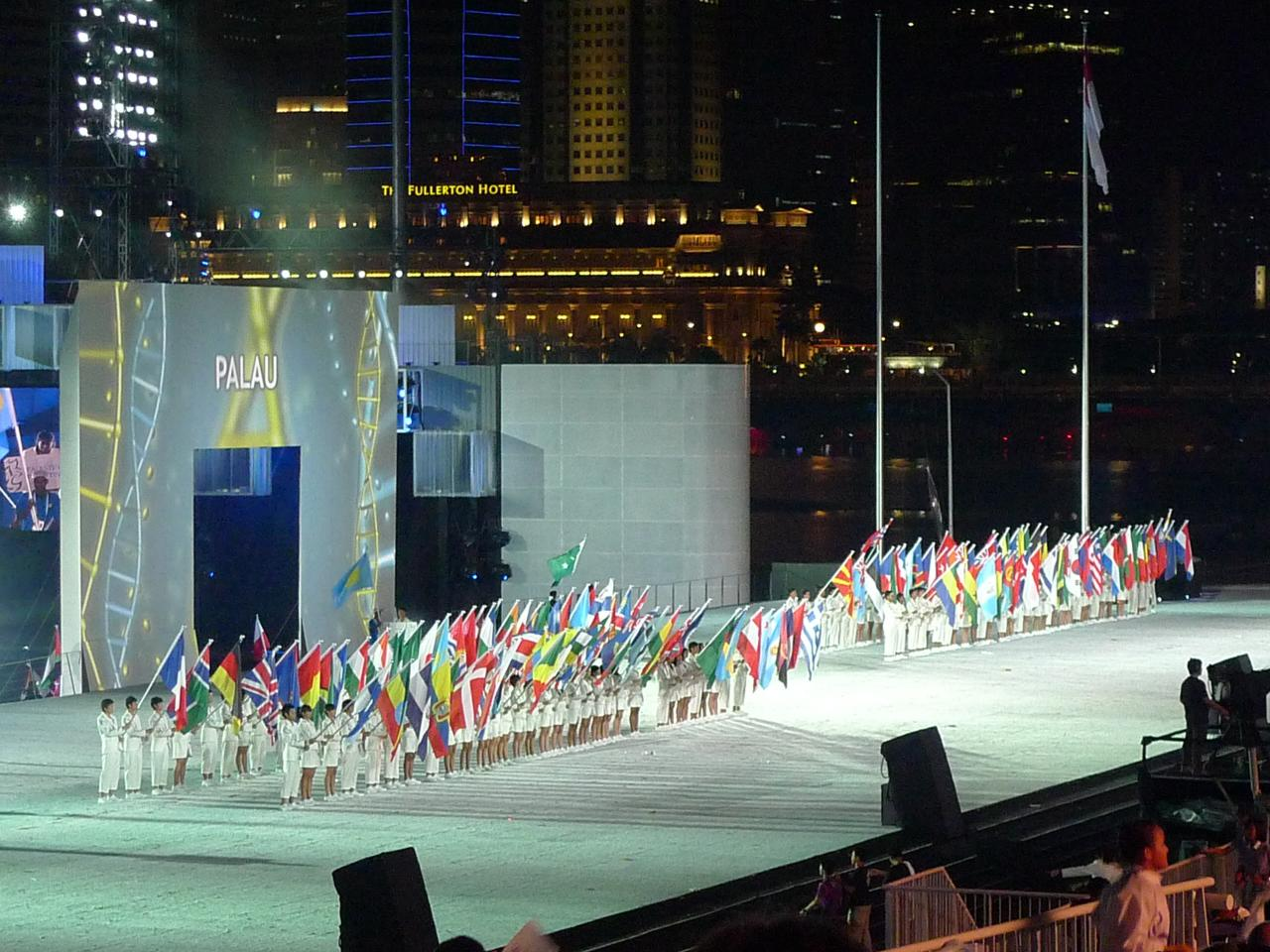
Flags of participating National Olympic Committees

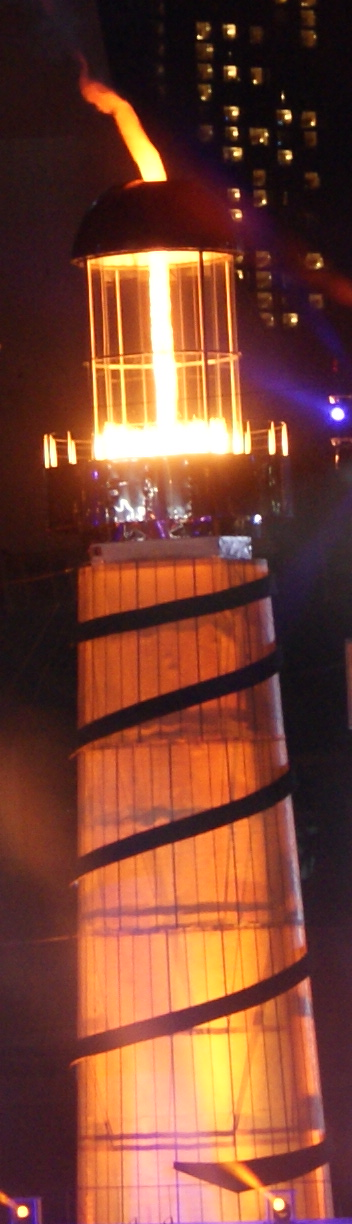
The cauldron which has a "vortex flame"

Each flag of the National Olympic Committees represented was brought on stage by an athlete representative. Following Olympic tradition, the flag of Greece entered first as the originator of the games, and the flag of Singapore entered last as the host nation. The flag ceremony was followed by the singing of the Games theme song and remarks by Ng Ser Miang, Chairman of the Singapore Youth Olympic Games Organising Committee, and Jacques Rogge, President of the International Olympic Committee. The Singapore Games were then officially declared opened by S.R. Nathan, the President of Singapore. The Olympic flag was brought on stage by eight Olympians—Tan Howe Liang, Yelena Isinbayeva, Yang Yang, Tan Eng Liang, Frankie Fredericks, Patricia Chan, Tao Li and Sergey Bubka—and handed to eight Singaporean youth athletes before it was raised with the singing of the Olympic Hymn in Greek by the Singaporean singers. The Olympic Oath was taken on behalf of all athletes by Caroline Chew, on behalf of all judges by Syed Abdul Kadir, and on behalf of all coaches by David Lim Fong Jock. Finally, a boat in the shape of a phoenix carried the Youth Olympic Flame across Marina Bay and was passed between six Singaporean youth athletes in a relay. Sailor Darren Choy was the final torchbearer and lit the cauldron.

The 32-metre (105 ft) tall cauldron was designed by Dr. Tsai Her-Mann, a fellow and resident inventor of the Singapore Science Centre. Designed to look like a lighthouse, its distinctive feature was a swirling 8 m (26 ft) column of fire dubbed the "vortex flame" or "fire tornado" inside a tube with an opening at the top end. Hot air that could reach 300 °C (572 °F) created around the flame rose, drawing cool air upwards from openings in the base of the tower. Just below the glass-panelled portion of the tower, the cool air was driven through angled guide vanes, thus creating the spiralling movement travelling upwards at 20 m/s (66 ft/s). The cauldron, which had been patented in Singapore and the United States, consumed about 2 MW (2,700 hp) of fuel, less than half the amount used by conventional Olympic cauldrons. Dr. Tsai said he hoped his design could be used for other Olympic events in future. The cauldron was secretly tested at 4:00 am during the two months leading up to the opening ceremony.

=== Calendar ===
The calendar of the Games was as follows:

| ● | Opening ceremony | ● | Event competitions | ● | Event finals | ● | Closing ceremony |

| August | 12th | 13th | 14th | 15th | 16th | 17th | 18th | 19th | 20th | 21st | 22nd | 23rd | 24th | 25th | 26th | Total gold medals |
|---|---|---|---|---|---|---|---|---|---|---|---|---|---|---|---|---|
| Ceremonies | | | ● | | | | | | | | | | | | ● | |
| Aquatics (Diving) | | | | | | | | | | 1 | 1 | 1 | 1 | | | 4 |
| Aquatics (Swimming) | | | | 3 | 8 | 4 | 7 | 3 | 9 | | | | | | | 34 |
| Archery | | | | | | | | 1 | 1 | 1 | | | | | | 3 |
| Athletics | | | | | | | | | | 12 | 12 | 12 | | | | 36 |
| Badminton | | | | | | | | 2 | | | | | | | | 2 |
| Basketball | | | | | | | | | | | | 2 | | | | 2 |
| Boxing | | | | | | | | | | | | | | 11 | | 11 |
| Canoeing | | | | | | | | | | | 3 | | | 3 | | 6 |
| Cycling | | | | | | | | | | | 1 | | | | | 1 |
| Equestrian | | | | | | | | | 1 | | | | 1 | | | 2 |
| Fencing | | | | 2 | 2 | 2 | 1 | | | | | | | | | 7 |
| Field hockey | | | | | | | | | | | | | 1 | 1 | | 2 |
| Football | | | | | | | | | | | | | 1 | 1 | | 2 |
| Gymnastics (Artistic) | | | | | | | 1 | 1 | | 5 | 5 | | | | | 12 |
| Gymnastics (Rhythmic) | | | | | | | | | | | | | | 2 | | 2 |
| Gymnastics (Trampoline) | | | | | | | | | 2 | | | | | | | 2 |
| Handball | | | | | | | | | | | | | | 2 | | 2 |
| Judo | | | | | | | | | | 3 | 3 | 2 | | 1 | | 9 |
| Modern pentathlon | | | | | | | | | | 1 | 1 | | 1 | | | 3 |
| Rowing | | | | | | | 4 | | | | | | | | | 4 |
| Sailing | | | | | | | | | | | | | | 4 | | 4 |
| Shooting | | | | | | | | | | | 1 | 1 | 1 | 1 | | 4 |
| Table tennis | | | | | | | | | | | | 2 | | | 1 | 3 |
| Taekwondo | | | | 2 | 2 | 2 | 2 | 2 | | | | | | | | 10 |
| Tennis | | | | | | | | | 1 | 3 | | | | | | 4 |
| Triathlon | | | | 1 | 1 | | | 1 | | | | | | | | 3 |
| Volleyball (Indoor) | | | | | | | | | | | | | | | 2 | 2 |
| Weightlifting | | | | 2 | 2 | 3 | 3 | 1 | | | | | | | | 11 |
| Wrestling | | | | 5 | 4 | 5 | | | | | | | | | | 14 |
| Total gold medals | | | | 15 | 19 | 16 | 18 | 11 | 14 | 26 | 27 | 20 | 6 | 26 | 3 | 201 |
| Cumulative gold medals | | | | 15 | 34 | 50 | 68 | 79 | 93 | 119 | 146 | 166 | 172 | 198 | 201 | 201 |

=== Participating National Olympic Committees ===
Participating National Olympic Committees
- Afghanistan (2)
- Albania (4)
- Algeria (21)
- American Samoa (4)
- Andorra (4)
- Angola (21)
- Antigua and Barbuda (4)
- Argentina (59)
- Armenia (14)
- Aruba (4)
- Australia (100)
- Austria (16)
- Azerbaijan (12)
- Bahamas (11)
- Bahrain (4)
- Bangladesh (6)
- Barbados (9)
- Belarus (49)
- Belgium (52)
- Belize (3)
- Benin (4)
- Bermuda (4)
- Bhutan (1)
- Bolivia (25)
- Bosnia and Herzegovina (5)
- Botswana (5)
- Brazil (81)
- British Virgin Islands (3)
- Brunei (3)
- Bulgaria (21)
- Burkina Faso (3)
- Burundi (4)
- Cambodia (3)
- Cameroon (6)
- Canada (60)
- Cape Verde (2)
- Cayman Islands (3)
- Central African Republic (5)
- Chad (2)
- Chile (50)
- China (68)
- Colombia (23)
- Comoros (4)
- Republic of the Congo (4)
- Democratic Republic of the Congo (16)
- Cook Islands (18)
- Costa Rica (5)
- Croatia (25)
- Cuba (41)
- Cyprus (9)
- Czech Republic (38)
- Denmark (30)
- Djibouti (4)
- Dominica (3)
- Dominican Republic (7)
- Ecuador (14)
- Egypt (74)
- El Salvador (4)
- Equatorial Guinea (21)
- Eritrea (7)
- Estonia (8)
- Ethiopia (7)
- Fiji (5)
- Finland (19)
- France (60)
- Gabon (2)
- The Gambia (4)
- Georgia (5)
- Germany (70)
- Ghana (20)
- Great Britain (39)
- Greece (28)
- Grenada (6)
- Guam (3)
- Guatemala (12)
- Guinea (3)
- Guinea-Bissau (4)
- Guyana (4)
- Haiti (22)
- Honduras (4)
- Hong Kong (14)
- Hungary (51)
- Iceland (6)
- India (32)
- Indonesia (14)
- Iran (52)
- Iraq (5)
- Ireland (25)
- Israel (15)
- Italy (62)
- Ivory Coast (6)
- Jamaica (15)
- Japan (71)
- Jordan (6)
- Kazakhstan (47)
- Kenya (10)
- Kiribati (4)
- North Korea (11)
- South Korea (72)
- Athletes from Kuwait (3)
- Kyrgyzstan (8)
- Laos (3)
- Latvia (11)
- Lebanon (5)
- Lesotho (4)
- Liberia (5)
- Libya (7)
- Liechtenstein (3)
- Lithuania (24)
- Luxembourg (5)
- Macedonia (6)
- Madagascar (6)
- Malawi (3)
- Malaysia (13)
- Maldives (4)
- Mali (7)
- Malta (4)
- Marshall Islands (4)
- Mauritania (4)
- Mauritius (9)
- Mexico (42)
- Federated States of Micronesia (3)
- Moldova (11)
- Monaco (4)
- Mongolia (11)
- Montenegro (22)
- Morocco (7)
- Mozambique (3)
- Myanmar (4)
- Namibia (6)
- Nauru (4)
- Nepal (4)
- Netherlands (36)
- Netherlands Antilles (5)
- New Zealand (54)
- Nicaragua (3)
- Niger (2)
- Nigeria (13)
- Norway (5)
- Oman (2)
- Pakistan (19)
- Palau (4)
- Palestine (4)
- Panama (7)
- Papua New Guinea (21)
- Paraguay (5)
- Peru (26)
- Philippines (9)
- Poland (43)
- Portugal (19)
- Puerto Rico (15)
- Qatar (6)
- Romania (30)
- Russia (96)
- Rwanda (4)
- Saint Kitts and Nevis (2)
- Saint Lucia (5)
- Saint Vincent and the Grenadines (3)
- Samoa (3)
- San Marino (4)
- São Tomé and Príncipe (4)
- Saudi Arabia (9)
- Senegal (6)
- Serbia (32)
- Seychelles (4)
- Sierra Leone (3)
- Singapore (129) (host)
- Slovakia (17)
- Slovenia (24)
- Somalia (2)
- Solomon Islands (3)
- South Africa (62)
- Spain (46)
- Sri Lanka (7)
- Sudan (8)
- Suriname (5)
- Swaziland (3)
- Sweden (15)
- Switzerland (22)
- Syria (4)
- Chinese Taipei (24)
- Tajikistan (6)
- Tanzania (4)
- Thailand (34)
- Timor-Leste (3)
- Togo (4)
- Tonga (2)
- Trinidad and Tobago (26)
- Tunisia (24)
- Turkey (55)
- Turkmenistan (5)
- Tuvalu (2)
- Uganda (6)
- Ukraine (55)
- United Arab Emirates (4)
- United States (82)
- Uruguay (4)
- Uzbekistan (21)
- Vanuatu (22)
- Venezuela (21)
- Vietnam (13)
- Virgin Islands (8)
- Yemen (5)
- Zambia (4)
- Zimbabwe (27)

==== Number of athletes by National Olympic Committee ====
| IOC Letter Code | Country | Athletes |
|---|---|---|
| SIN | Singapore | 129 |
| AUS | Australia | 100 |
| RUS | Russia | 96 |
| USA | United States | 82 |
| BRA | Brazil | 81 |
| EGY | Egypt | 74 |
| KOR | South Korea | 72 |
| JPN | Japan | 71 |
| GER | Germany | 70 |
| CHN | China | 68 |
| ITA | Italy | 62 |
| RSA | South Africa | 62 |
| CAN | Canada | 60 |
| FRA | France | 60 |
| ARG | Argentina | 59 |
| TUR | Turkey | 55 |
| UKR | Ukraine | 55 |
| NZL | New Zealand | 54 |
| BEL | Belgium | 52 |
| IRI | Iran | 52 |
| HUN | Hungary | 51 |
| CHI | Chile | 50 |
| BLR | Belarus | 49 |
| KAZ | Kazakhstan | 47 |
| ESP | Spain | 46 |
| POL | Poland | 43 |
| MEX | Mexico | 42 |
| CUB | Cuba | 41 |
| GBR | Great Britain | 39 |
| CZE | Czech Republic | 38 |
| NED | Netherlands | 36 |
| THA | Thailand | 34 |
| IND | India | 32 |
| SRB | Serbia | 32 |
| DEN | Denmark | 30 |
| ROU | Romania | 30 |
| GRE | Greece | 28 |
| ZIM | Zimbabwe | 27 |
| PER | Peru | 26 |
| TRI | Trinidad and Tobago | 26 |
| BOL | Bolivia | 25 |
| CRO | Croatia | 25 |
| IRL | Ireland | 25 |
| LTU | Lithuania | 24 |
| SLO | Slovenia | 24 |
| TPE | Chinese Taipei | 24 |
| TUN | Tunisia | 24 |
| COL | Colombia | 23 |
| HAI | Haiti | 22 |
| MNE | Montenegro | 22 |
| SUI | Switzerland | 22 |
| VAN | Vanuatu | 22 |
| ALG | Algeria | 21 |
| ANG | Angola | 21 |
| BUL | Bulgaria | 21 |
| GEQ | Equatorial Guinea | 21 |
| PNG | Papua New Guinea | 21 |
| UZB | Uzbekistan | 21 |
| VEN | Venezuela | 21 |
| GHA | Ghana | 20 |
| FIN | Finland | 19 |
| PAK | Pakistan | 19 |
| POR | Portugal | 19 |
| COK | Cook Islands | 18 |
| SVK | Slovakia | 17 |
| AUT | Austria | 16 |
| COD | Democratic Republic of the Congo | 16 |
| ISR | Israel | 15 |
| JAM | Jamaica | 15 |
| PUR | Puerto Rico | 15 |
| SWE | Sweden | 15 |
| ARM | Armenia | 14 |
| ECU | Ecuador | 14 |
| HKG | Hong Kong | 14 |
| INA | Indonesia | 14 |
| MAS | Malaysia | 13 |
| NGR | Nigeria | 13 |
| VIE | Vietnam | 13 |
| AZE | Azerbaijan | 12 |
| GUA | Guatemala | 12 |
| BAH | Bahamas | 11 |
| PRK | North Korea | 11 |
| LAT | Latvia | 11 |
| MDA | Moldova | 11 |
| MGL | Mongolia | 11 |
| KEN | Kenya | 10 |
| BAR | Barbados | 9 |
| CYP | Cyprus | 9 |
| MRI | Mauritius | 9 |
| PHI | Philippines | 9 |
| KSA | Saudi Arabia | 9 |
| EST | Estonia | 8 |
| KGZ | Kyrgyzstan | 8 |
| SUD | Sudan | 8 |
| ISV | Virgin Islands | 8 |
| DOM | Dominican Republic | 7 |
| ERI | Eritrea | 7 |
| ETH | Ethiopia | 7 |
| LBA | Libya | 7 |
| MLI | Mali | 7 |
| MAR | Morocco | 7 |
| PAN | Panama | 7 |
| SRI | Sri Lanka | 7 |
| BAN | Bangladesh | 6 |
| CMR | Cameroon | 6 |
| GRN | Grenada | 6 |
| ISL | Iceland | 6 |
| CIV | Ivory Coast | 6 |
| JOR | Jordan | 6 |
| MKD | Macedonia | 6 |
| MAD | Madagascar | 6 |
| NAM | Namibia | 6 |
| QAT | Qatar | 6 |
| SEN | Senegal | 6 |
| TJK | Tajikistan | 6 |
| UGA | Uganda | 6 |
| BIH | Bosnia and Herzegovina | 5 |
| BOT | Botswana | 5 |
| CAF | Central African Republic | 5 |
| CRC | Costa Rica | 5 |
| FIJ | Fiji | 5 |
| GEO | Georgia | 5 |
| IRQ | Iraq | 5 |
| LIB | Lebanon | 5 |
| LBR | Liberia | 5 |
| LUX | Luxembourg | 5 |
| AHO | Netherlands Antilles | 5 |
| NOR | Norway | 5 |
| PAR | Paraguay | 5 |
| LCA | Saint Lucia | 5 |
| SUR | Suriname | 5 |
| TKM | Turkmenistan | 5 |
| YEM | Yemen | 5 |
| ALB | Albania | 4 |
| ASA | American Samoa | 4 |
| AND | Andorra | 4 |
| ANT | Antigua and Barbuda | 4 |
| ARU | Aruba | 4 |
| BRN | Bahrain | 4 |
| BEN | Benin | 4 |
| BER | Bermuda | 4 |
| BDI | Burundi | 4 |
| COM | Comoros | 4 |
| CGO | Republic of the Congo | 4 |
| DJI | Djibouti | 4 |
| ESA | El Salvador | 4 |
| GAM | The Gambia | 4 |
| GBS | Guinea-Bissau | 4 |
| GUY | Guyana | 4 |
| HON | Honduras | 4 |
| KIR | Kiribati | 4 |
| LES | Lesotho | 4 |
| MDV | Maldives | 4 |
| MLT | Malta | 4 |
| MHL | Marshall Islands | 4 |
| MTN | Mauritania | 4 |
| MON | Monaco | 4 |
| MYA | Myanmar | 4 |
| NRU | Nauru | 4 |
| NEP | Nepal | 4 |
| PLW | Palau | 4 |
| PLE | Palestine | 4 |
| RWA | Rwanda | 4 |
| SMR | San Marino | 4 |
| STP | São Tomé and Príncipe | 4 |
| SEY | Seychelles | 4 |
| SYR | Syria | 4 |
| TAN | Tanzania | 4 |
| TOG | Togo | 4 |
| UAE | United Arab Emirates | 4 |
| URU | Uruguay | 4 |
| ZAM | Zambia | 4 |
| BIZ | Belize | 3 |
| IVB | British Virgin Islands | 3 |
| BRU | Brunei | 3 |
| BUR | Burkina Faso | 3 |
| CAM | Cambodia | 3 |
| CAY | Cayman Islands | 3 |
| DMA | Dominica | 3 |
| GUM | Guam | 3 |
| GUI | Guinea | 3 |
| IOC | Athletes from Kuwait | 3 |
| LAO | Laos | 3 |
| LIE | Liechtenstein | 3 |
| MAW | Malawi | 3 |
| FSM | Federated States of Micronesia | 3 |
| MOZ | Mozambique | 3 |
| NCA | Nicaragua | 3 |
| VIN | Saint Vincent and the Grenadines | 3 |
| SAM | Samoa | 3 |
| SLE | Sierra Leone | 3 |
| SOL | Solomon Islands | 3 |
| SWZ | Swaziland | 3 |
| TLS | Timor-Leste | 3 |
| AFG | Afghanistan | 2 |
| CPV | Cape Verde | 2 |
| CHA | Chad | 2 |
| GAB | Gabon | 2 |
| NIG | Niger | 2 |
| OMA | Oman | 2 |
| SKN | Saint Kitts and Nevis | 2 |
| SOM | Somalia | 2 |
| TGA | Tonga | 2 |
| TUV | Tuvalu | 2 |
| BHU | Bhutan | 1 |

=== Sports ===
The Games featured 26 sports with a total of 31 disciplines and 201 events. Within the 201 events, there were 8 mixed team events (Mixed-NOCs), 4 mixed team events (NOCs), 1 open event (Equestrian), 106 men's events, and 82 women's events. These included two disciplines under the IOC classification of aquatics (diving and swimming), and three under gymnastics (artistic, rhythmic and trampoline). Each sport in the Games was represented by a pictogram inspired by the official "Spirit of Youth" emblem consisting of a red flame, a blue star and a green crescent, which was depicted participating in each of the 26 sports of the Youth Olympic Games. The sport pictograms had a distinctive, contemporary graphic style that was intended to make them a highly recognisable feature of the Games. The list of sports is as follows:

- Aquatics
  - Diving (4)
  - Swimming (34)
- Archery (2+1)
- Athletics (34+2)
- Badminton (2)
- Basketball (2)
- Boxing (11)
- Canoeing (6)
- Cycling (1)
- Equestrian (1+1)
- Fencing (6+1)
- Field hockey (2)
- Football (2)
- Gymnastics
  - Artistic gymnastics (12)
  - Rhythmic gymnastics (2)
  - Trampolining (2)
- Handball (2)
- Judo (8+1)
- Modern pentathlon (2+1)
- Rowing (4)
- Sailing (4)
- Shooting (4)
- Table tennis (3)
- Taekwondo (10)
- Tennis (4)
- Triathlon (2+1)
- Volleyball (2)
- Weightlifting (11)
- Wrestling (14)

About 3,600 athletes, aged 14 to 18, participated in the Games. All 205 National Olympic Committees (NOCs) were represented, except Kuwait, which was suspended in January 2010 due to alleged government interference; however, three Kuwaiti athletes competed under the Olympic flag. A unique feature of the YOG was the creation of the mixed-NOCs team event. To foster friendship among participants, teams were formed by athletes from different countries to compete on an intercontinental basis. Mixed-NOC sports included equestrian-jumping, fencing, judo, modern pentathlon, and triathlon. There were eight events which composed entirely of mixed-NOCs teams, and as such all 25 medals in these events, including two bronzes in judo, were swept by mixed-NOCs teams.

The first gold medal of the Games was awarded to 18-year-old Japanese triathlete Yuka Sato, who won the girls' event on 15 August. Host nation Singapore's first medal was a bronze in taekwondo for Daryl Tan on 16 August. The first gold medal for a mixed-NOC event was awarded to team Europe 1, consisting of Yana Egoryan of Russia and Italians Marco Fichera Marco, Camilla Mancini, Leonardo Affede, Alberta Santuccio Alberta and Eduardo Luperi, which won the team competition in fencing.

=== Culture and Education Programme ===
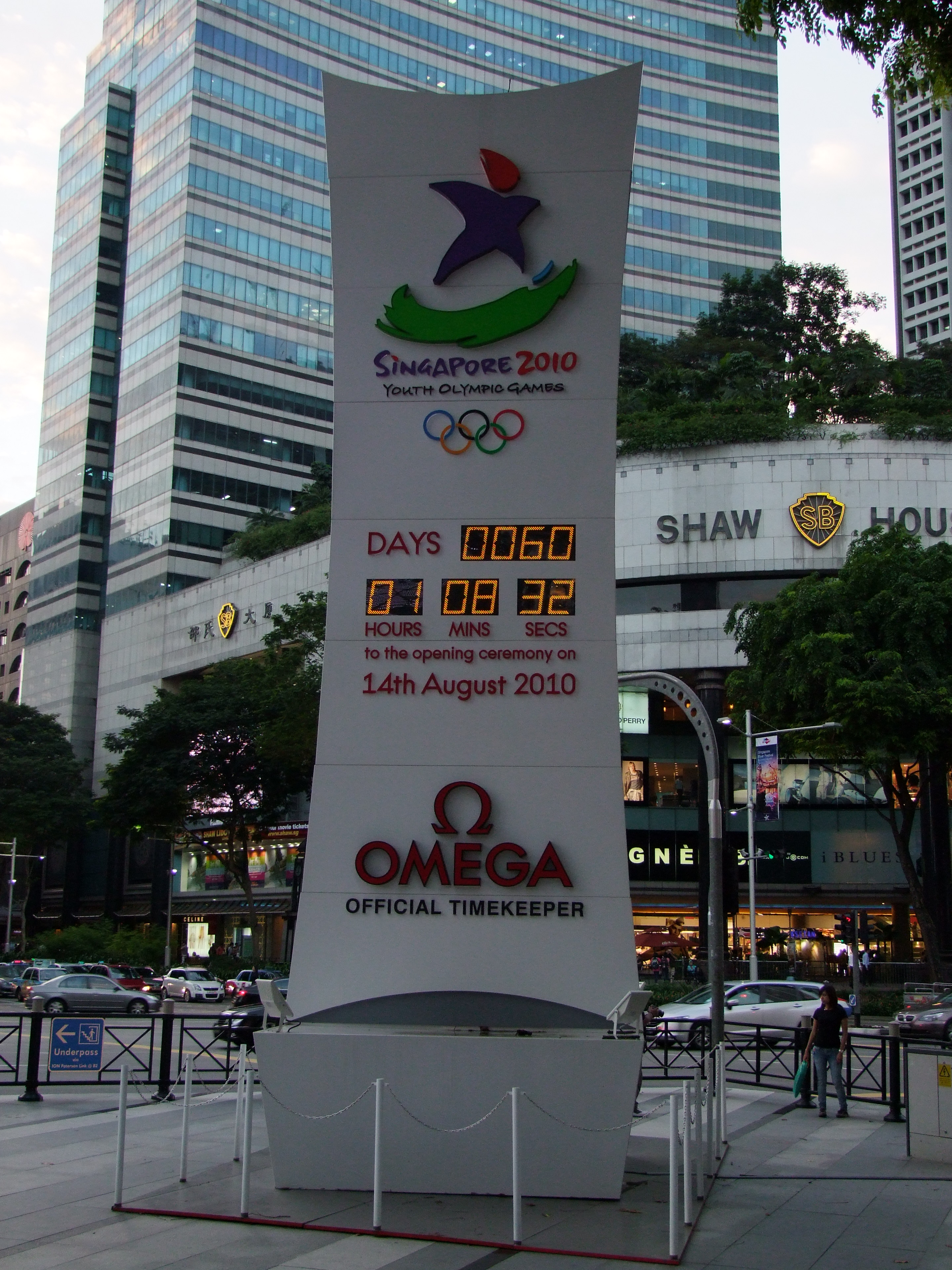
Omega countdown clock at the corner of Orchard Road and Scotts Road

The IOC set a vision for the YOG to be an event comprising a balance of sports, culture and education. The objective of the Culture and Education Programme (CEP) that athletes participated in was to educate, engage and influence the athletes to develop true sportsmanship and to live by the Olympic values of excellence, respect and friendship, while having fun at the same time.

To promote cultural education among the participating youths, the YOG programme incorporated live youth performances, art installations and festivals revolving around the Olympics spirit and cultural diversity. A wide range of activities took place, such as hands-on workshops, talks by Olympians, outdoor activities, community projects and exhibition booths, all based on five themes:

- Olympism – the origins, philosophy, structure and evolution of the modern Olympics.
- Skills development – the different aspects of a professional athletic career, such as personal development, career options and management of transitions in life.
- Well-being and healthy lifestyle – healthy eating, stress management and risks in sport such as doping.
- Social responsibility – being a responsible global citizen by caring for the environment and promoting sustainable development and community relations.
- Expression – interacting with and learning from fellow athletes through digital media and evening festivals at the Youth Olympic Village.

Singapore's Youth Olympic Games Learning Centre is located at the SYOGOC headquarters along Kay Siang Road. It was officially opened by the SNOC President Teo Chee Hean and former pole vaulting champion Sergei Bubka on 30 October 2008. The two-storey, 600-square-metre (6,500 sq ft) facility was open to the public for free allow visitors to discover and experience the spirit of the Olympics and trace Singapore's Games journey from winning the bid to host the first YOG in 2010. It featured several sections aimed at educating the public about different sports, as well as the history of Olympic records and the events lined up for the YOG. The public could also try their hand at table tennis, fencing and basketball at interactive sections. It subsequently closed for renovations from 18 August till the end of 2010.

=== Closing ceremony ===
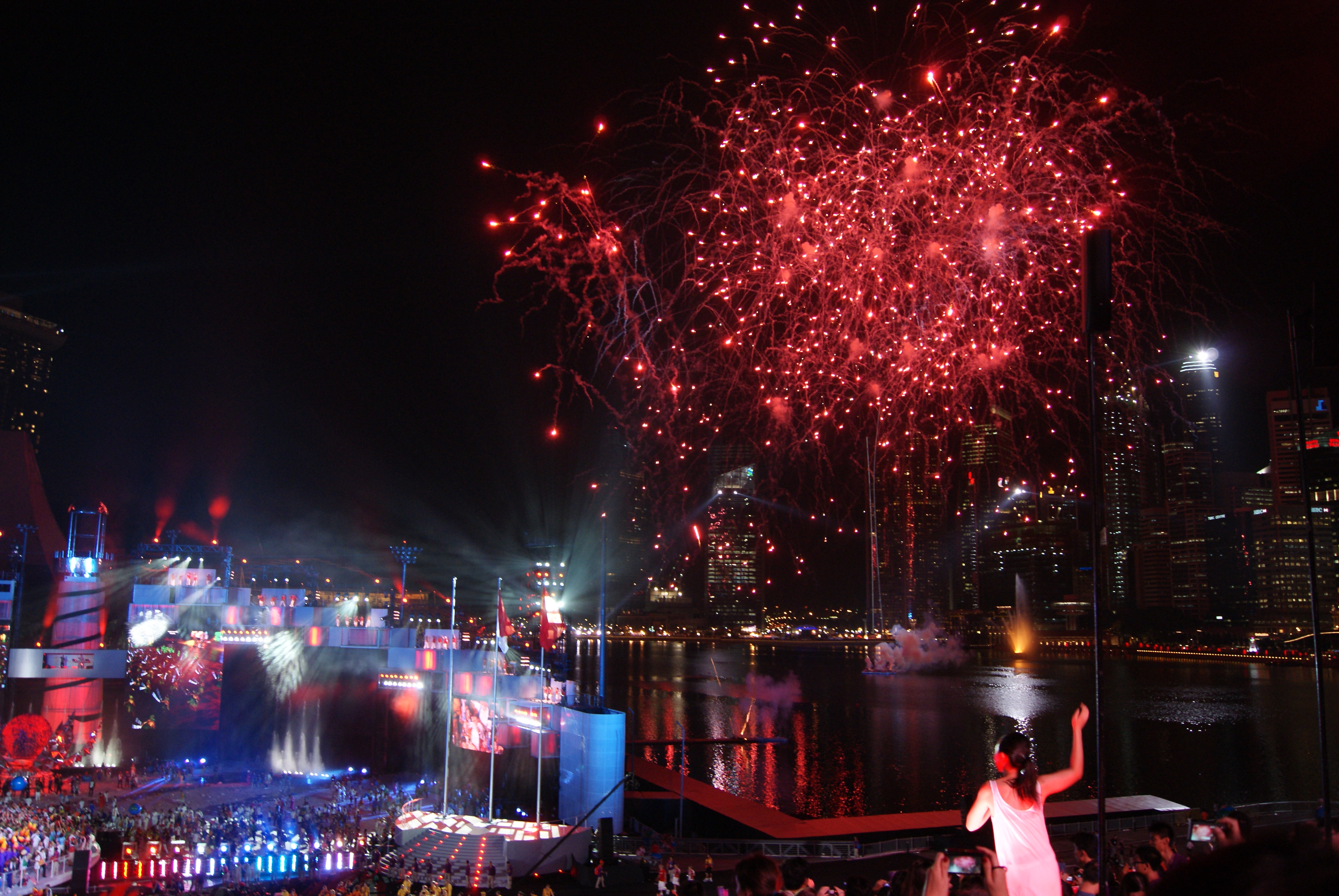
Fireworks over Marina Bay during the closing ceremonies.

The closing ceremony of the Games was held on 26 August at The Float@Marina Bay. The show began proper at 8pm Singapore time with youths, cheerleaders and the YOG mascots Lyo and Merly dancing to a medley of "Fame" and "Fight for This Love". Following the arrival of IOC President Jacques Rogge and Prime Minister of Singapore Lee Hsien Loong, 12-year-old Nathania Ong led the choir and the audience in singing the national anthem of Singapore. In the next segment "Blazing the Trail", 5 young singers performed an upbeat song while students dressed to resemble the "Spirit of Youth", the Singapore 2010 emblem, performed a mass display item. Following the item, the athletes and the flags representing all competing nations made their way onto the floating platform. A short clip showing the highlights of the games was then shown on the LED screens on the stage, accompanied by singer Heleyana-Ann Lachica Fernandez and a trio of musicians performing "A New Story".

The Protocol segment followed the performances. A tribute was made to the 20,000 volunteers who participated in the Games, with Singapore swimmer Rainer Ng making a short speech thanking the volunteers and eight other athletes presenting bouquets to eight representative volunteers. This was then followed by speeches from Ng Ser Miang, Chairman of the Singapore Youth Olympic Games Organising Committee, and Jacques Rogge, IOC President, with Mr. Rogge officially declaring the Games closed in accordance with tradition. The Olympic flag was then lowered with the singing of the Olympic Anthem. In the handover ceremony, the Olympic flag was handed over from Teo Ser Luck, acting as the Mayor of Singapore, through Jacques Rogge, to Ji Jianye, Mayor of Nanjing, China, the host city of the 2014 Summer Youth Olympics. The national anthem of China was then played with the raising of China's flag, and a short video presentation showcasing Nanjing followed. The Youth Olympic Flame was then finally extinguished to the sounds of a flugelhorn. A Celebration Concert marked the end of the show with songs and performances from local artistes.

== Medal table ==
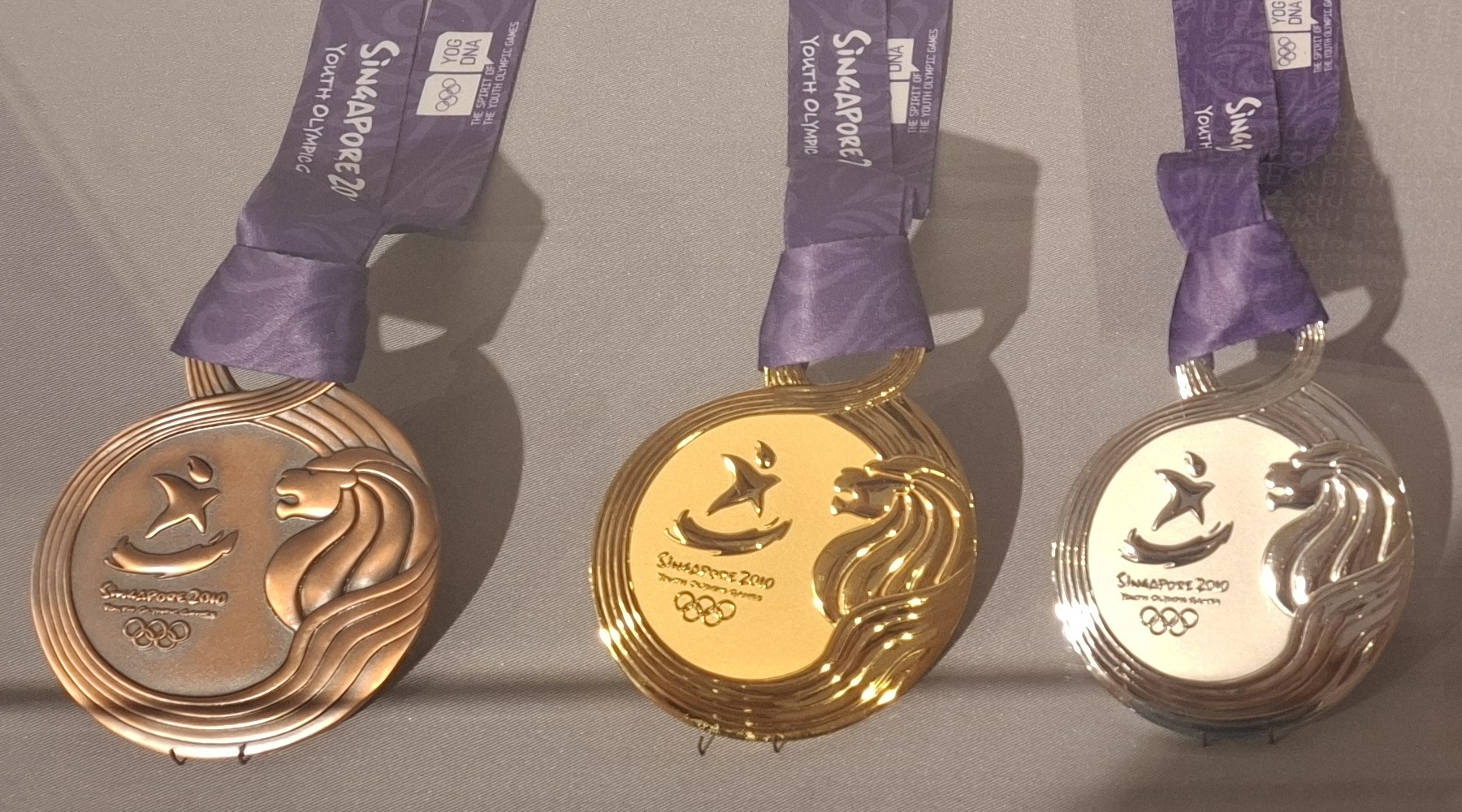
Medals of the 2010 Summer Youth Olympics

* Host nation (Singapore)

2010 Summer Youth Olympics medal table
| Rank | Nation | Gold | Silver | Bronze | Total |
|---|---|---|---|---|---|
| 1 | China | 30 | 16 | 5 | 51 |
| 2 | Russia | 18 | 14 | 11 | 43 |
| 3 | South Korea | 11 | 4 | 4 | 19 |
| 4 | Ukraine | 9 | 9 | 15 | 33 |
| – | Mixed-NOCs | 9 | 8 | 11 | 28 |
| 5 | Cuba | 9 | 3 | 2 | 14 |
| 6 | Australia | 8 | 13 | 8 | 29 |
| 7 | Japan | 8 | 5 | 3 | 16 |
| 8 | Hungary | 6 | 4 | 5 | 15 |
| 9 | France | 6 | 2 | 7 | 15 |
| 10 | Italy | 5 | 9 | 5 | 19 |
| 11–98 | Remaining | 83 | 112 | 145 | 340 |
| Totals (98 entries) | | 202 | 199 | 221 | 622 |

Source: IOC

Although the SYOGOC did not keep an official medal tally, news outlets, such as xinmsn, kept unofficial medal tables, where medals won by mixed-NOCs teams are credited to the NOCs that the athletes belong to. The following table lists the top ten ranked NOCs and the host nation. See 2010 Summer Youth Olympics medal table for more details and a full table with medals won by mixed-NOCs teams counted separately.

== Media coverage ==
The Games organisers used online media to market the event, including Friendster, Facebook, Twitter, WordPress and the official Youth.sg 2010 discussion forum. Contracts were signed with 166 broadcasters to provide worldwide television broadcasts for the Games. These include China Central Television, which telecast the opening ceremony live and has been screening nine hours of coverage each day on its CCTV-5 sports channel, and the Universal Sports television network in the United States. Most print media coverage was by Asian newspapers and news agencies such as the China Youth Daily, Guangzhou Daily, Nanjing Daily and People's Daily and the Xinhua News Agency from China; the Asahi Shimbun and Yomiuri Shimbun from Japan; and the China Times and United Daily News and the Central News Agency from Taiwan; though Australian newspapers ran brief news items, results and pictures, and the British press followed events due to interest generated by the forthcoming 2012 Summer Olympics in London. In Canada, the games were broadcast by Canada's Olympic Broadcast Media Consortium, a joint venture between CTVglobemedia and Rogers Media. Coverage of those games was limited to a one-hour daily highlights package on Sportsnet and TSN2 (rebroadcast several weeks later on TSN). The consortium did not, however, own rights to the 2012 Winter Youth Olympics in Innsbruck.

== Marketing ==
=== Emblem ===
The SYOGOC launched an international emblem design competition on 29 July 2008 through 29 August 2008 through its official website, requiring that the emblem incorporate the three themes of the Singapore identity, the Olympic ideals, and a youthful spirit. The emblem competition for the Games attracted 1,500 participants, and the winning design entitled "Spirit of Youth" was unveiled on 10 January 2010. A contest to choose the official medal design for the first Youth Olympics was launched by the IOC in 2009. From November to December almost a hundred entries from 34 countries were received. Online voting ended on 22 January 2010.

=== Mascot ===
The mascots of the Games were Lyo and Merly, a fire-themed lion and a water-themed female merlion respectively.

=== Songs ===
The official theme song of the Games was "Everyone". It was performed by five singers representing six continents of the world, namely, Jody Williams (Africa), Sean Kingston (Americas), Tabitha Nauser (Asia), Steve Appleton (Europe) and Jessica Mauboy (Oceania). The executive producer of the song was local music producer Ken Lim.

== Concerns and controversies ==
The initial budget of 108 million SGD was exceeded over three times amounting to more than 300 million SGD.

=== Attendance ===
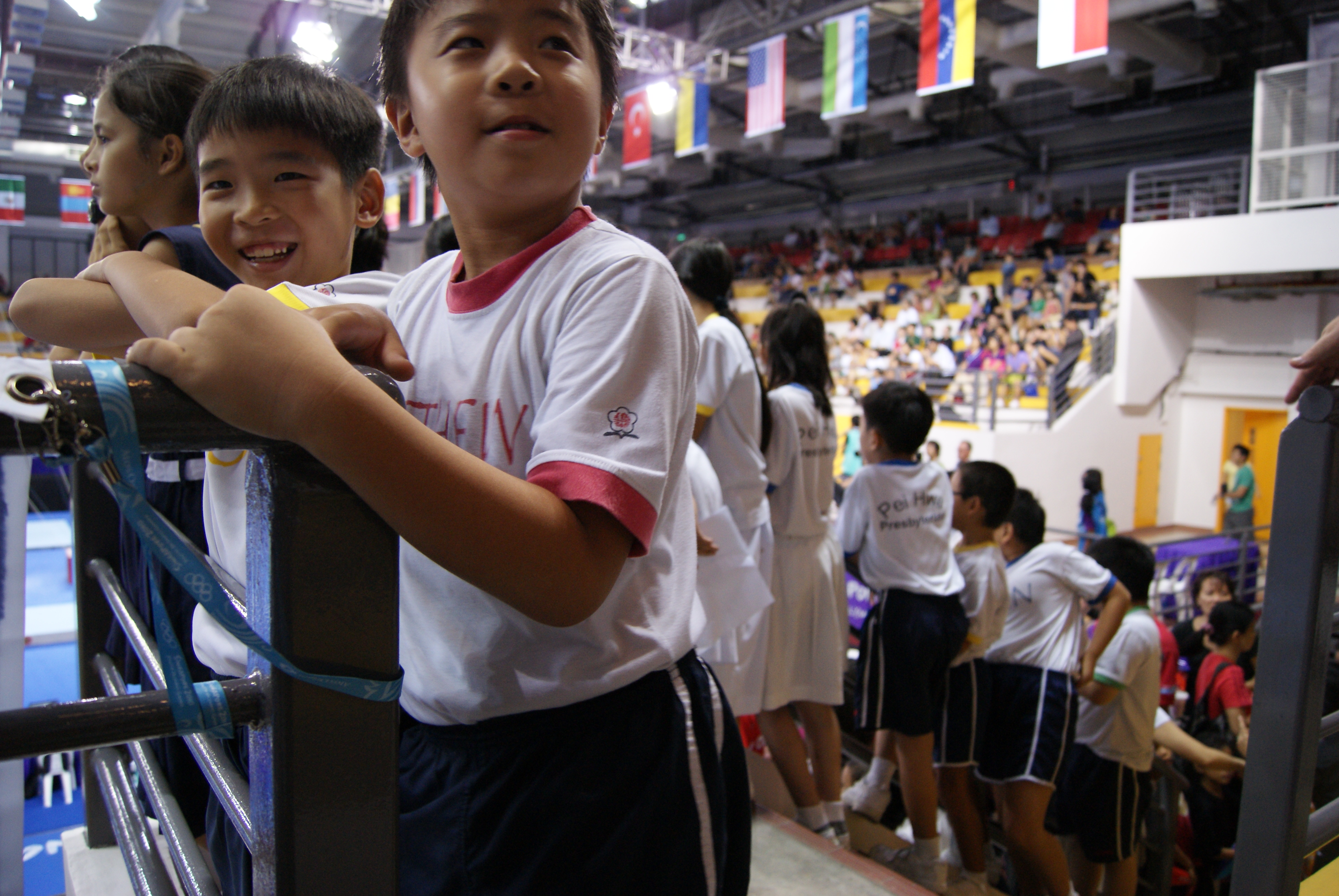
Students watching the artistic gymnastics competition at Bishan Sports Hall on 16 August 2010

The International Herald Tribune claimed in a 16 August 2010 article that ticket sales to events had been "sluggish" despite an expensive government campaign featuring billboards around Singapore to encourage neighbourhoods to celebrate the event, and that there had been reports that children had been "forced" to attend pre-Games events. The latter was denied by organisers, SYOGOC Chairman Ng Ser Miang saying: "[J]ust look at the faces of the children that are there, the sparkle in their eyes and the smiles on their faces. Those are not things you can force."

Members of the public commented that although some events were sold out, there appeared to be many unoccupied seats at venues, and claimed that this was because the Ministry of Education (MOE) made a block purchase of 87,000 passes to be given to schools. However, students usually did not stay for the full duration of sessions, which can be up to seven hours long. The MOE denied that students were to blame, stating that more than 95% of students allocated tickets had attended events, and that some schools had asked to purchase additional tickets due to overwhelming demand. The SYOGOC announced that once sessions had begun, unoccupied seats would be resold to people who turned up in person at venues. To enable venue managers to gauge the number of seats available for resale, teachers escorting students to events were instructed to inform venue managers if they intended to leave before sessions ended and the number of seats occupied by students. On 20 August, the organisers reported that tickets were sold out for all 26 sports except girls' football.

Controversy also arose from the YOG attendance policy in Kuo Chuan Presbyterian Primary School, a local primary school. The school stated that a S$5 refundable deposit was required from students who attend the YOG events on a non-school day. The principal, Clifford Chua, said that it was to "ensure that our children learn the value of responsibility and not take this rare opportunity for granted, by wasting the ticket and depriving others of the chance". Also, the deposit was returned even if the child did not attend the event. However, the move garnered mixed reactions from parents, who either supported the idea or felt it was not the right way to do things. Some other schools such as Nanyang Girls High School, Bukit View Primary School and Park View Primary School gave free tickets to their students while Anglo-Chinese School (Primary) encouraged co-pay of $1 to $2 by the students to teach them to treasure their tickets.

=== Iranian withdrawal from taekwondo final ===
On 16 August 2010, Iranian officials withdrew Mohammed Soleimani from the men's under-48-kilogram category taekwondo final against Israel's Gili Haimovitz, citing an ankle injury. According to the officials, Soleimani had first hurt his ankle at the World Junior Championships in Mexico earlier in the year, and the injury had flared up again during his semifinal contest against the US's Gregory English. Soleimani was sent to hospital for an X-ray, and his ankle was put into a cast. Haimovitz was awarded the gold medal by default at a victory ceremony at the Suntec International Convention Centre from which Soleimani, the silver medallist, was absent. Interviewed later on, Soleimani said he was "very sad" to have missed the bout as he was "sure [he] was going to get the gold medal". Israel's chef-de-mission Daniel Oren claimed that the pullout had been politically motivated. He said: "It's not the first time this has happened at the Olympics. But this is a first for a medal match. To be honest, once our boy got into the final, we knew that this is going to happen. I spoke to our boy after the final and he, of course, was disappointed that he did not have a chance to win his gold through an actual fight. I feel more sorry for the Iranian boy. He must have trained hard to get to this stage and was not given a chance to fight. We are dealing with sports here, youth sports, in fact. It's a pity that politics got involved." However, IOC spokesman Mark Adams said: "As far as the IOC is concerned, there is no sinister intent here. What we know factually is that the athlete injured his ankle and was sent to the hospital for an X-ray. Tests revealed he did not suffer anything broken, and he is all right now. So unless more factual information is available, it [the controversy] is mere speculation." This was reiterated by IOC President Jacques Rogge on 17 August: "He [Soleimani] was driven to the hospital, was examined by a Singaporean doctor, totally independent, not belonging to the organisation and he diagnosed an ankle sprain. For us, that's the end of the story." Previously, Iran has stated that since its existing government does not recognize Israel as a state, its policy is to withdraw from competing against the country.

=== Bolivian footballers alleged to be overaged ===
Arturo Garcia, chairman of the Coaches Association of Santa Cruz in Bolivia, told the Bolivian newspaper La Razón he had proof that at least five players in the Bolivian boys' football team had been over the age limit of 15 years. Bolivia beat Haiti 5–0 to take the gold medal in the finals of the boys' football tournament on 25 August 2010. Bolivian Deputy Sports Minister Miguel Angel Rimba ordered an investigation into the claim.

Montenegro coach Sava Kovačević, whose team was knocked out by Bolivia in the semifinals, said that Montenegro would ask football governing body FIFA to look into the matter. However, FIFA announced they would not be doing so as complaints concerning the eligibility of players should have been submitted in writing to FIFA's headquarters in Singapore at the Youth Olympic Games no later than five days before the first match, that is, by 8 August. FIFA also said that its staff had met all footballers individually at the Olympic Village and had checked their passports against their dates of birth provided by their respective National Olympic Committees.

=== Doping ===
Two wrestlers, Greco-Roman 50 kg silver medallist Nurbek Hakkulov of Uzbekistan and 63 kg freestyle wrestler Johnny Pilay of Ecuador, were disqualified on 15 October after testing positive for the banned diuretic furosemide.

== See also ==
- 1998 World Youth Games
- List of IOC country codes

== Notes ==
| New sporting event | Summer Youth Olympic Games; Singapore; I Youth Olympiad (2010) | Succeeded by Nanjing |
