= Equatorial Guinea at the 2010 Summer Youth Olympics =

- IOC code: GEQ
- NOC: Equatoguinean Olympic Committee

in Singapore
- Competitors: 21 in 2 sports
- Flag bearer: Antimo Constantino Oyono Nchama
- Medals Ranked 74th: Gold 0 Silver 1 Bronze 0 Total 1

Summer Youth Olympics appearances
- 2010; 2014; 2018

Equatorial Guinea competed at the 2010 Summer Youth Olympics, the inaugural Youth Olympic Games, held in Singapore from 14 August to 26 August 2010.

== Medalists ==
Medal	Name	Sport	Event	Date
Silver	Equatorial Guinea Girls' Football team: Justina Alene; María Angono; Inmaculada Angue; Mónica Asangono; Felicidad Avomo; Celestina Bikoro; Leticia Biyogo; Vida Fegue; Justina Lohoso; Rosa Mangue; Belinda Mikue; Pilar Mondjeli; Dolores Nchama; Verónica Nchama; Judit Ndong; Felicidad Nguema; Antonia Obiang; Constancia Okomo	Football	Girls' tournament	24 Aug

== Athletics ==
=== Boys ===
Track and Road Events

Athletes	Event	Qualification		Final	
Athletes	Event	Result	Rank	Result	Rank
Antimo Oyono	Boys’ 200m	23.39	22 qD	23.08	20

=== Girls ===
Track and Road Events

Athletes	Event	Qualification		Final	
Athletes	Event	Result	Rank	Result	Rank
María del Pilar Loheto	Girls’ 100m	13.83	30 qE	13.71	29
Marina Ayene Nvo	Girls’ 1000m	3:02.64	15 Q	3:05.17	17

== Football ==
=== Girls ===
Squad List	Event	Group Stage		Semifinal	Final	Rank
Squad List	Event	Group B	Rank	Semifinal	Final	Rank
María Angono; Rosa Mangue; Leticia Nchama Biyogo; Mónica Asangono; Pilar Mondjeli; Celestina Bikoro; Justina Alene; Immaculada Angue; Felicidad Avomo; Judit Ndong (C); Constancia Okomo; Justina Lohoso; Felicidad Nguema; Vida Fegue; Verónica Nchama; Belinda Mikue; Antonia Obiang; Dolores Nchama	Girls' Football	Trinidad and Tobago; W 3-1	1 Q	Iran; W 4-1	Chile; L 1-1; PSO 3-5	Silver medal
María Angono; Rosa Mangue; Leticia Nchama Biyogo; Mónica Asangono; Pilar Mondjeli; Celestina Bikoro; Justina Alene; Immaculada Angue; Felicidad Avomo; Judit Ndong (C); Constancia Okomo; Justina Lohoso; Felicidad Nguema; Vida Fegue; Verónica Nchama; Belinda Mikue; Antonia Obiang; Dolores Nchama	Girls' Football	Chile; W 4-1	1 Q	Iran; W 4-1	Chile; L 1-1; PSO 3-5	Silver medal

=== Group B ===
Team	Pld	W	D	L	GF	GA	GD	Pts
Equatorial Guinea	2	2	0	0	7	2	+5	6
Chile	2	1	0	1	2	4	−2	3
Trinidad and Tobago	2	0	0	2	1	4	−3	0

15 August 2010
20:45

Trinidad and Tobago	1 – 3	Equatorial Guinea
Prescott 64'	Report	Avomo 7', 40+1'; V. Nchama 59'

Jalan Besar Stadium, Singapore
Attendance: 827
Referee: Gabriela Bandeira (Uruguay)

18 August 2010
20:45

Equatorial Guinea	4 – 1	Chile
Ndong 12', 68'; Avomo 80', 80+2'	Report	Orellana 35'

Jalan Besar Stadium, Singapore
Attendance: 1,547
Referee: Sandra Braz (Portugal)

=== Semi-finals ===
21 August 2010
20:45

Equatorial Guinea	4 – 1	Iran
Biyogo 32'; Avomo 36'; Ndong 56' (pen.) 66'	Report	Ardestani 46'

Jalan Besar Stadium, Singapore
Attendance: 2,707
Referee: Sandra Braz (Portugal)

=== Final ===
24 August 2010
20:45

Chile	1 – 1	Equatorial Guinea
Orellana 25'	Report	Ndong 55' (pen.)
Penalties
Navarrete (penalty scored); Rodríguez (penalty scored); Roa (penalty scored); González Parra (penalty scored); Orellana (penalty scored)	5 – 3	Ndong (penalty scored); V. Nchama (penalty scored); Nguema (penalty scored); Obiang (penalty missed)

Jalan Besar Stadium, Singapore
Attendance: 2,000
Referee: Kateryna Monzul (Ukraine)
