= Equatorial Guinea at the 2026 Summer Youth Olympics =

- Flag of Equatorial Guinea
- IOC code: GEQ
- NOC: Comité Olímpico de Guinea Ecuatorial
- Website: www.cnosc.net

in Dakar, Senegal October 31, 2026 – November 13, 2026
- Competitors: 3 in 3 sports
- Flag bearers: Emilia Biyogo Bikie & Andeke Engono
- Medals: Gold 0 Silver 0 Bronze 0 Total 0

Summer Youth Olympics appearances
- 2010; 2014; 2018; 2026

Equatorial Guinea is scheduled to compete at the 2026 Summer Youth Olympics in Dakar, Senegal from October 31 to November 13, 2026. This will mark Equatorial Guinea's fourth appearance at the Youth Olympics, after making its debut in 2010.

Taekwondo practitioner Emilia Biyogo Bikie and boxer Andeke Engono served as the flag bearers for the opening ceremony.

== Competitors ==
The following is the list of number of competitors participating at the Games per sport/discipline.

Sport	Men	Women	Total
Athletics	1	0	1
Boxing	1	0	1
Taekwondo	0	1	1
Total	2	1	3

== Athletics ==
Equatorial Guinea entered one male athlete.

=== Track & road events ===
Men

Athlete	Event	Heat		Semifinal		Final	
Athlete	Event	Result	Rank	Result	Rank	Result	Rank
Walterio Manuel	200 m						

== Boxing ==
Equatorial Guinea entered one male athlete in the −60 kg category.

Men

Athlete	Weight	Round of 16	Quarterfinals	Semifinals	Final	
Athlete	Weight	Opposition Result	Opposition Result	Opposition Result	Opposition Result	Rank
Andeke Engono	–60 kg					

== Taekwondo ==
Equatorial Guinea entered one female athlete.

Women

Athlete	Event	Round of 16	Quarterfinals	Semifinals	Repechage	Final / BM	
Athlete	Event	Opposition Result	Opposition Result	Opposition Result	Opposition Result	Opposition Result	Rank
Emilia Biyogo Bikie	-44 kg	Bye					
