= Papua New Guinea at the 2010 Summer Youth Olympics =

- IOC code: PNG
- NOC: Papua New Guinea Olympic Committee

in Singapore
- Competitors: 21 in 4 sports
- Flag bearer: Steven Kari
- Medals: Gold 0 Silver 0 Bronze 0 Total 0

Summer Youth Olympics appearances
- 2010; 2014; 2018

Papua New Guinea competed at the 2010 Summer Youth Olympics, the inaugural Youth Olympic Games, held in Singapore from 14 August to 26 August 2010.

== Medalists ==
Medal	Name	Sport	Event	Date
Bronze	John Rivan	Athletics - Oceania	Boys' medley relay	23 Aug

== Athletics ==
=== Boys ===
Track and Road Events

Athletes	Event	Qualification		Final	
Athletes	Event	Result	Rank	Result	Rank
John Rivan	Boys' 200m	DSQ qD		22.12	18
Lepani Naivalu (FIJ); John Rivan (PNG); Nicholas Hough (AUS); Raheen Williams (AUS)	Boys' medley relay			1:52.71	Bronze medal

== Football ==
=== Girls ===
Squad List	Event	Group Stage		5th Place Match	Rank
Squad List	Event	Group A	Rank	5th Place Match	Rank
Cathura Ramoi; Carolyn Obi; Bridget Kadu; Talitha Irakau; Josephine McNamara; Lucy Maino; Grace Steven; Alexier Stephen; Fiona Vulia; Geenaidah Willie; Dinna Awele; Catherine Sebenaia; Ramona Lorenz; Rumona Morris (C); Georgina Kaikas; Biangka Gubag; Maravai Vulia; Wena Laka	Girls' Football	Iran; L 0–1	3	Trinidad and Tobago; L 0-0; PSO 2–4	6
Cathura Ramoi; Carolyn Obi; Bridget Kadu; Talitha Irakau; Josephine McNamara; Lucy Maino; Grace Steven; Alexier Stephen; Fiona Vulia; Geenaidah Willie; Dinna Awele; Catherine Sebenaia; Ramona Lorenz; Rumona Morris (C); Georgina Kaikas; Biangka Gubag; Maravai Vulia; Wena Laka	Girls' Football	Turkey; L 0–4	3	Trinidad and Tobago; L 0-0; PSO 2–4	6

Group A

Team	Pld	W	D	L	GF	GA	GD	Pts
Turkey	2	2	0	0	8	2	+6	6
Iran	2	1	0	1	3	4	−1	3
Papua New Guinea	2	0	0	2	0	5	−5	0

Qualified for semifinals

15 August 2010
18:00

Iran	1 – 0	Papua New Guinea
Ardestani 43'	Report

Jalan Besar Stadium, Singapore
Attendance: 827
Referee: Kateryna Monzul (Ukraine)

18 August 2010
18:00

Papua New Guinea	0 – 4	Turkey
	Report	Duran 6'; Baskol 52'; Aytop 80+1', 80+3'

Jalan Besar Stadium, Singapore
Attendance: 1,380
Referee: Therese Raissa Neguel (Cameroon)

5th place contest

23 August 2010
18:00

Papua New Guinea	0 – 0	Trinidad and Tobago
	Report
Penalties
Steven (penalty missed); Morris (penalty scored); Obi (penalty missed); Kaikas (penalty scored)	2 – 4	Warrick (penalty scored); Asson (penalty scored); Jacob (penalty scored); Sequea (penalty scored)

Jalan Besar Stadium, Singapore
Attendance: 1,615
Referee: Gabriela Bandeira (Uruguay)

== Swimming ==
Athletes	Event	Heat		Semifinal		Final	
Athletes	Event	Time	Position	Time	Position	Time	Position
Ian Nakmai	Boys’ 50m Breaststroke	32.06	13 Q	31.66	13	Did not advance	
Ian Nakmai	Boys’ 100m Breaststroke	DNS				Did not advance	

== Weightlifting ==
Boys'

Athlete	Event	Snatch	Clean & Jerk	Total	Rank
Steven Kari	77kg	115	155	270	4
