= 2010 Summer Youth Olympics torch relay =

- Host city: Singapore
- Countries visited: Greece, Germany, Senegal, Mexico, New Zealand, South Korea
- Start date: July 23, 2010
- End date: August 14, 2010

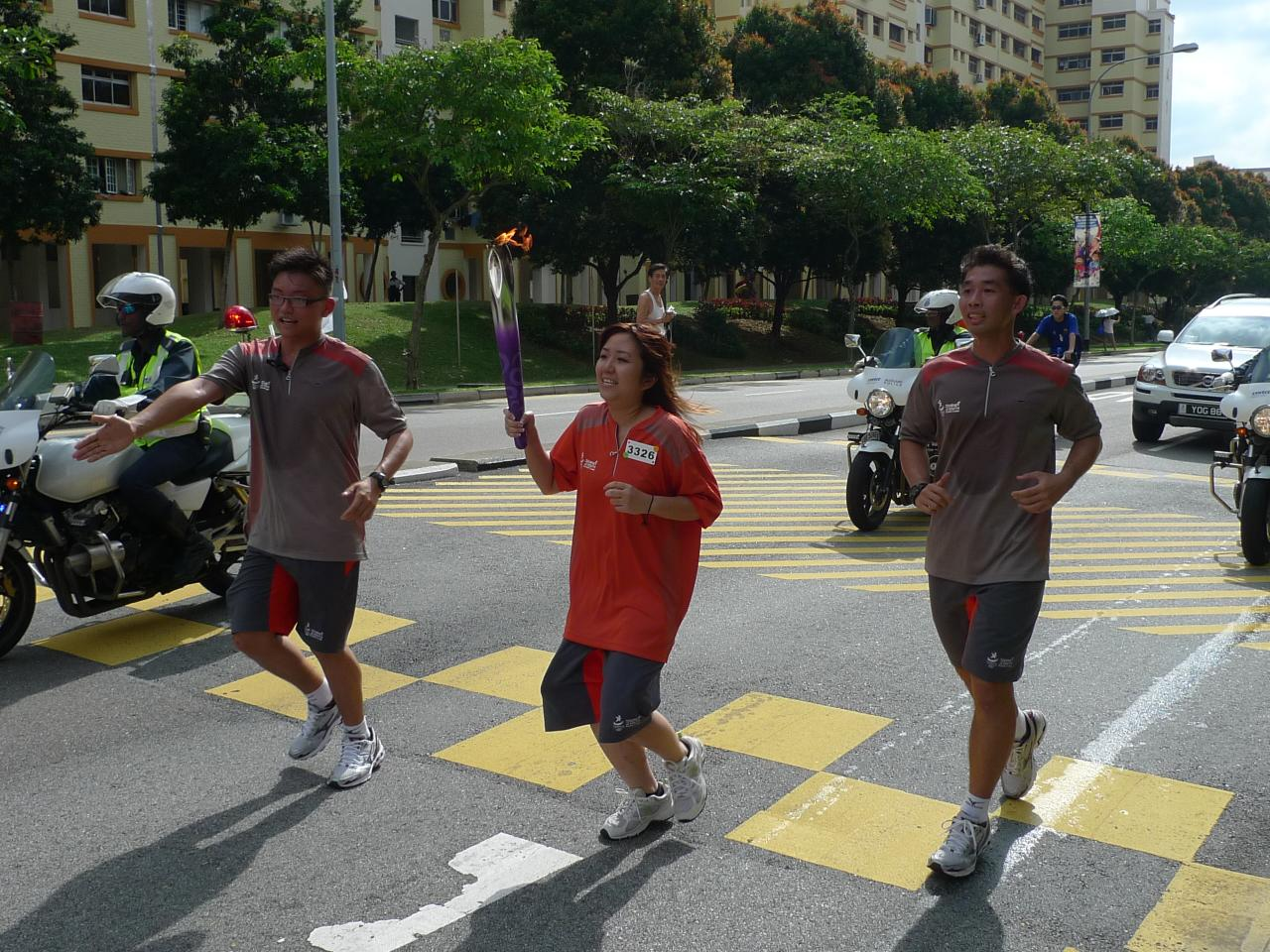
The torch relay in northeast Singapore on August 10, 2010

The 2010 Summer Youth Olympics torch relay was run from 23 July until 14 August 2010, prior to the 2010 Summer Youth Olympics held in Singapore. The torch relay was termed The Journey of the Youth Olympic Flame, or JYOF, by the Singapore Youth Olympic Games Organising Committee (SYOGOC). It began with the traditional flame lighting ceremony in Olympia, Greece on 23 July 2010, and was followed by a 13-day round the world tour across five cities, namely Berlin, Germany; Dakar, Senegal; Mexico City, Mexico; Auckland, New Zealand; and Seoul, South Korea. Following the international leg, the torch arrived in host city Singapore on 6 August 2010 for the domestic leg.

The torch traversed the five cities, representing the five continents of the world: Europe, Africa, Americas, Oceania and Asia, in the given order. A number of famous athletes, leaders, and media personalities were involved the torch relay. Notably, a schoolboy, Low Wei Jie, who was not part of the torch relay was given the opportunity to bear the torch after local newspaper reports of him having following the torch in the rain throughout the day earlier.

The organisers felt that as the games were the inaugural Youth Olympic Games (YOG), it was significant for the spirit of Olympism to reach out to as many youth as possible across the world. The torch relay was held as "the link that connects the youth of the world to the Olympic movement". While there was active community participation in the torch relay, some were reserved about the event and the games itself. However, there were no major disruptions or protests throughout the torch relay, unlike the earlier Beijing Olympics torch relay. The torch relay was brought to an end on 13 August, when Minister Mentor Lee Kuan Yew lit the cauldron at Marina Bay. However, the Youth Olympic flame was to last till the closing ceremony of the games.

== Concept ==
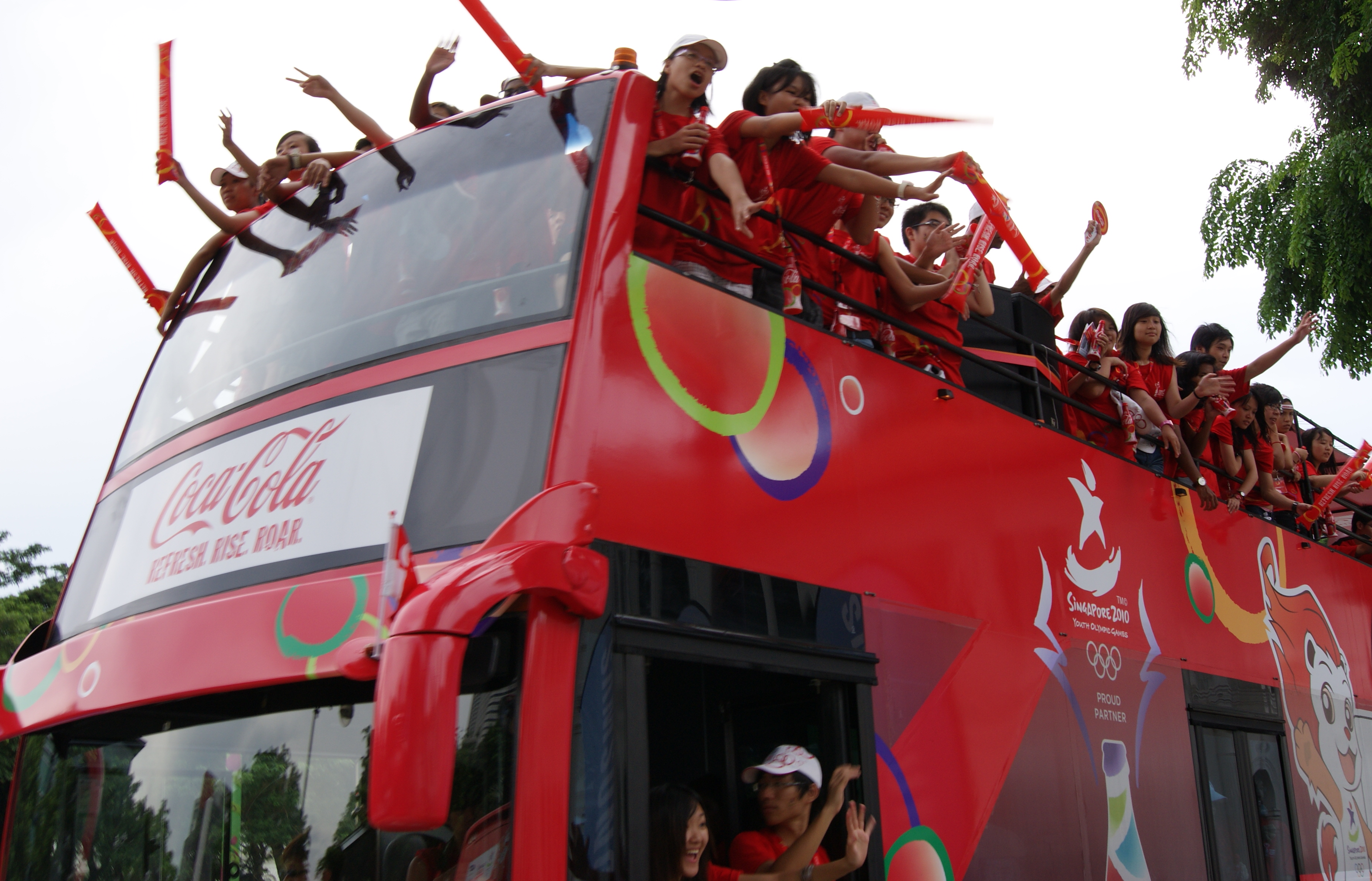
Supporters cheering on an open-top coach in the mobile column, ahead of the torchbearer, along Bras Basah Road.

Although the IOC had scrapped any further international legs of the Olympic torch relay due to problems encountered during the 2008 Summer Olympics torch relay, the executive board approved an exception for Singapore. The plan however was different from the traditional Olympics; the flame was to visit one city from each continent, where community celebrations would take place.

The five cities, dubbed the celebration cities, selected for the torch relay were Berlin, Germany; Dakar, Senegal; Mexico City, Mexico; Auckland, New Zealand; and Seoul, Korea. These five cities each represented the five continents of the world — Europe, Africa, Americas, Oceania and Asia — respectively. The inaugural Youth Olympic Games would commence when the Youth Olympic Flame lit the Olympic cauldron at the opening ceremony on 14 August 2010, marking the commencement of the games. The opening ceremony was held at the main venue of the games, The Float@Marina Bay.

== Relay elements ==
=== Torch ===
Compared to the two most recent Olympic torches for the 2008 Summer Olympics and the 2010 Winter Olympics, which weighed 985g and 1.6 kg respectively, the Youth Olympic torch was one of the lightest Olympic torches ever constructed, weighing in at about 560g without its canister and 740g with it. The torch measured about 60 cm in length, and had a width from 5 to 8 cm. It was designed to incorporate the elements of fire and water, and was constructed using aluminium and polymers. The reflective surface of aluminium, covering the top part of the torch body, was meant to act as a mirror, reflecting images of its surroundings as it went along the relay route. The handle was coated with non-slip material.

According to the organisers, fire represented youths' passion and "burning desire to learn and excel, blazing the trail in life" (Blazing the Trail was the tagline of the games). Water represented Singapore, which is an island country surrounded entirely by water bodies and which had its origins as a seaport; it also reflected the "vibrant and dynamic nature" of the city-state.

When the flame was not being carried by a torchbearer, it was kept in a safety lantern. At the beginning of each day of the torch relay, the flame from the safety lantern would be used to light the Youth Olympic torch. At the end of each day, the flame would be returned to the safety lantern. The safety lantern was also used to keep backup flames lit, allowing the main torch to be re-lit should it go out. At least three safety lanterns were kept lit throughout the duration of the relay.

=== Cauldron ===
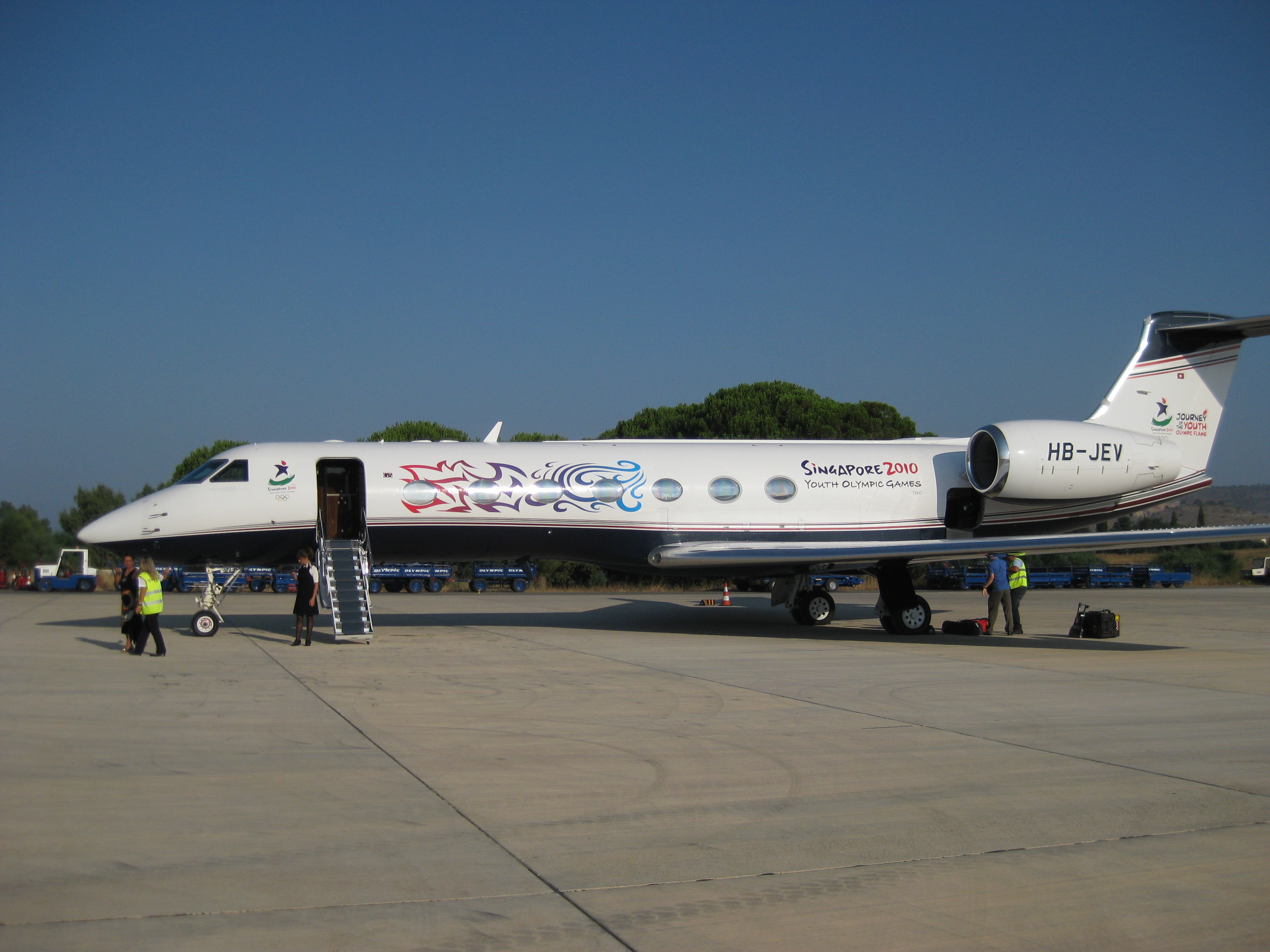
The Gulfstream G550 used for the Journey of the Youth Olympic Flame

The cauldron, not to be confused with the Olympic cauldron lit during the opening ceremony, was lit at each community celebration site. These were found at the last location of activities during the relay at the 5 cities visited, as well as at the end of each day during the domestic leg.

=== Aircraft ===
A specially chartered Gulfstream G550 (tail no. HB-JEV) was chartered to bring the flame on its journey around the world. The G550 was painted with a special livery for this purpose.

=== Torchbearers ===
For the domestic leg, members of the public were invited to sign up to be one of the 2400 torchbearers. A large number of torchbearers were youths, with the youngest being just 11 years old and the oldest, an ex-Olympian, being 82 years of age.

== Sequence of events ==
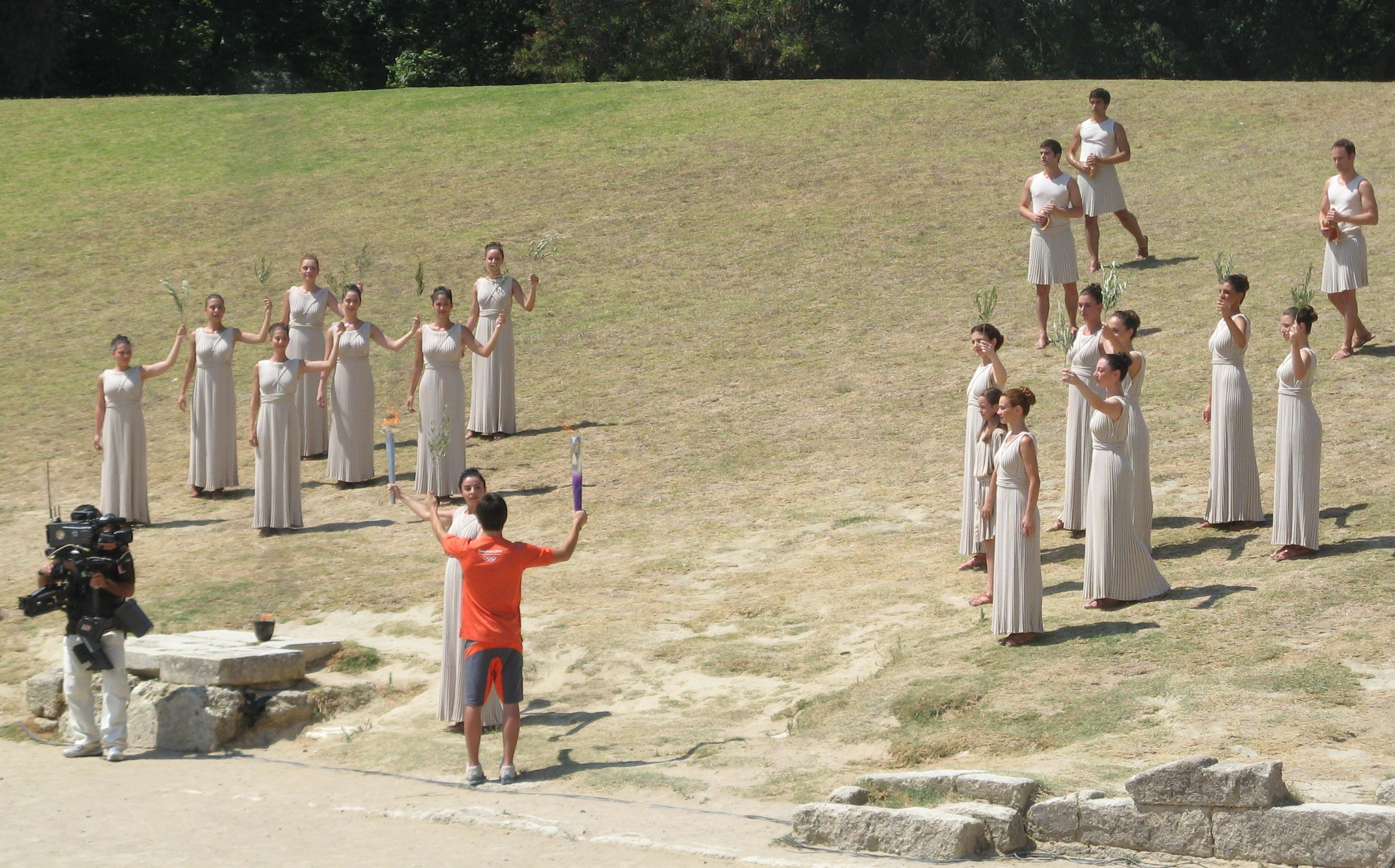
Flame Lighting Ceremony on 23 July 2010

=== International leg ===
==== Flame lighting ceremony in Greece ====
In Olympic tradition, the flame was lit at the ancient site of the first Olympic Games in Olympia, Greece. The ceremony was led by Greek actress Ino Menegaki before being passed to 2 Greek and 2 Singaporean youth athletes for a short relay around the ancient stadium. The flame was then handed over to the Singapore delegation at the ancient stadium itself, unlike previous Olympic Games where the flame was only handed to the Organising Committee in Athens.

==== Berlin, Germany ====
The Youth Olympic flame made its first stop in Berlin, Germany, home of the 1936 Olympic Games, representing the continent of Europe, on 24 July 2010. The flame made a brief visit to the Siemensstadt, a famous sports club in the city, and was received by youth participating in sports there. It then made its way by boat towards the Pariser Platz on the Spree River, where is passed the Haus del Kulturen de Welt, a leading European centre for arts and culture. The city celebrations were held near the Brandenburg Gate, arguably one of Europe's most recognisable landmarks. The Celebration Cauldron in the city was lit by former gymnast Ronny Ziesmer as well as two German athletes bound for the games. Dirk Nowitzki, the 2008 Summer Olympics flagbearer for country, and André Lange, the 2010 Winter Olympics flagbearer, were present as well.

The Singapore Showcase, which was to be held at the other cities as well, was presented by Singapore's Ministry of Information, Communication and the Arts and SYOGOC to give the audience an insight into life in Singapore. There were four segments in the performance; the dance segment, the music segment, the sport segment, and a music, dance and sporty extravaganza. Singaporean singer Erick Guansing performed a local song, Bunga Sayang, during the music segment. Chairman of the SYOGOC and vice-president of the IOC Ng Ser Miang commented on the celebrations, expressing his "thrill" in seeing "the level of enthusiasm for sports displayed by youths here in Berlin as well as Germany". Ng accompanied the flame throughout its journey across the world.

==== Dakar, Senegal ====
The continent of Africa was represented by Dakar, capital of Senegal. The flame made its arrival on 25 July 2010, one day after its stop in Berlin. Prime Minister of Senegal Souleymane Ndéné Ndiaye, Mayor of Dakar Khalifa Sall, and president of the Association of National Olympic Committees of Africa General Lassana Palenfo were onsite to receive the Singapore delegation. The Youth Olympic flame travelled around the city, transiting through various historical sites which included the city hall, the Hotel De Ville, and the presidential palace, the Palais de la Republique, of the country.

It was transported through water to Goree Island, a former slave colony and a UNESCO World Heritage Site, where the City Celebrations took place. Local performances by the Senegalese, as well as Singaporean performances were put up; the song Singapore Town was played there by Singaporean band Supernova. A Senegalese music group performed a local folk song in Walof about "hope and passion for the future", with SYOGOC chairman Ng commenting that Dakar had "embraced the Olympic values of Excellence, Friendship and Respect in everyday life".

==== Mexico City, Mexico ====
Youths from various National Olympic Committees (NOCs) of the Pan American Sports Organization welcomed the Youth Olympic Flame when it arrived at the Universidad Iberoamericana in Mexico City, Mexico. The city, which hosted the 1968 Summer Olympics, was the only one among the five which had celebrations spanning two days, from 27 to 28 July. Around 6,000 spectators accompanied the flame during its journey in Mexico City.

The flame visited a number of places in the city, including a community center for less privileged children in Iztapalapa; the Ecoguarda Center, where Mexicans learn about the environment; and Hidalgo Garden in Coyoacan. The Youth Olympic flame also stopped by the Angel of Independence in downtown Mexico, where a hundred Mariachi musicians dressed in traditional Mexican charro suits played a traditional birthday song for the flame. It also went to the Government Palace of Mexico. The Flame then proceeded to Zocalo, the main square in the heart of the historic centre of Mexico City. The City Celebration in Mexico City took place on the night of 28 July. The Singapore Showcast involved the percussion groove of Ethnicity, an ethnic fusion pop band, as well as singing performances by Singaporean Erick Guansing as well as Singapore Idol finalist Gayle Nerva.

==== Auckland, New Zealand ====
The Youth Olympic flame arrived in Auckland, New Zealand on 2 August 2010, five days after the celebrations in Mexico City; time had been lost as the flame crossed the International Dateline. The city was the penultimate stop on the international leg of the torch relay. The flame was greeted by the Pōwhiri, a traditional Maori welcoming ceremony, at the Manukau Civic Centre Gallery. Following the Powhiri, the flame visited the Bucklands Beach Yacht Club. Present there were athletes Barbara Kendall and Elise Beavis, who was bound for the YOG a few days later. YOG athlete Mohammad Ali (different from boxer Muhammad Ali) and Olympic gold medallist Yvette Corlett welcomed the flame at the Pakuranga Athletics Club.

The City Celebration was culmination of the flame's tour in Auckland, held at the TelstraClear Pacific Events Centre, where Sir John Walker and Beavis ignited the Celebration Cauldron with the Youth Olympic flame. The lighting of the Celebration Cauldron was witnessed by President of the New Zealand Olympic Committee Mike Stanley, Mayor of Manukau City Len Brown, Singapore's Minister for Community Development, Youth and Sports Dr Vivian Balakrishnan, and Singapore's High Commissioner to New Zealand M.P.H Rubin, amongst other guests. The Singapore Showcase at the celebrations involved music and theatrical performances, including a special rendition of Rasa Sayang, a Singapore folksong.

==== Seoul, South Korea ====
The flame arrived at Seoul, South Korea, the last stop in the international leg, on 4 August. It marked the third city the Youth Olympic Flame visited to have hosted the senior Olympic Games before, with the other two being Mexico City and Berlin. Stops were made the Cheong-Gye Square, the Olympic Park and Gwanghwamun Plaza, where the City Celebrations were held.

In Seoul, the Youth Olympic flame revisited the city's Olympic Park and the Seoul Olympic Stadium, where the 1988 Summer Olympics was held. It marks fourth time to hold the Olympic torch relay in 1988, 2004, 2008 and 2010. in 1988 Towards the end of the day, the Flame made a stop at Cheonggye Square which was adjacent to the Cheonggyecheon, a creek that runs through downtown Seoul. The flame then headed towards Gwanghwamun Square, the site of the City Celebration, accompanied by costumed musicians playing traditional Korean music. Ethnic fusion pop band Ethnicity performed once again; so did singer Erick Guansing as well as Gayle Nervas, who sang Home, a Singaporean song, completing a medley of Singapore songs.

=== Domestic leg ===
The domestic leg of the torch relay covered most of Singapore's residential areas ending at Marina Bay on 13 August 2010. Due to Singapore's small size and road limitations and organisers wanting as many people to have a chance to be a torchbearer at the same time, each torchbearer carried the torch for a distance of about 100 m before handing it to the next bearer.

==== Flame arrival celebrations, 6 August ====
The Youth Olympic Flame was first publicly shown to the public at the National University of Singapore as part of the annual NUSSU Rag and Flag display. Celebrations started in the early evening, with the display of floats and performances by various faculty clubs, staff and alumni, before floats and displays showcasing the 6 countries involved were brought out. The flame was brought out, where the cauldron was lit by President S R Nathan, along with the Amanda Lim and Silas Abdul Razak.

==== Day 1, 7 August ====
The first day of the torch relay in Singapore started in the heart of Singapore, at CHIJ Toa Payoh in Toa Payoh. The relay continued through the estates of Toa Payoh, Bishan and Ang Mo Kio, before ending the day at Nanyang Polytechnic. Notable torchbearers for the day include celebrities Joanne Peh, Randall Tan, Elim Chew and Zheng Geping.

==== Day 2, 8 August ====
The second day saw the torch relay visit the south-eastern areas of Singapore, made up of Potong Pasir, Serangoon, Paya Lebar, Bedok, Eunos, Joo Chiat, Marine Parade and Simei before ending the day at ITE College East. Notable torchbearers for the day were adventurers David Lim, Khoo Swee Chiow and Sophia Pang.

The relay then took a break on 9 August, for Singapore's National Day celebrations. However, it made a surprise visit at the National Day Parade, 2010 held at the Padang, where the nation celebrated its 45th year of independence.

==== Day 3, 10 August ====
The third day had the relay resume in the north-eastern part of Singapore, going through Punggol, Sengkang, Hougang, Pasir Ris and Tampines, ending the day with the torch crossing Bedok Reservoir on dragonboat to reach Temasek Polytechnic. The youngest torchbearer, Nurhidayah Rahmat, ran in the morning of the day.

In the morning, Low Wei Jie, 12, followed the relay in the morning showers for more than 2 hours, catching the attention of relay official and the media. His efforts and enthusiasm did not go unappreciated, as relay officials gave him a slot on the last day of the relay.

==== Day 4, 11 August ====
The fourth day of the relay covered the north-western part of Singapore, visiting Bukit Timah, Holland, Bukit Panjang, Yishun, Sembawang and Woodlands before ending the day at Republic Polytechnic. Notable torchbearers for the day include members of the first Singapore's Women's Everest Team and Ajit Singh, the oldest torchbearer for the relay at 82 years of age then. In the morning, a flypast by the Singapore Youth Flying Club helped start the relay for the day. The torch also made a stop at the Singapore Zoo in the afternoon.

==== Day 5, 12 August ====
The industrial heartland in south-western Singapore was covered in the fifth day, covering Jurong, Boon Lay, Bukit Batok, Choa Chu Kang, West Coast, Clementi, Dover and Buona Vista, ending the day at Singapore Polytechnic. Some ASEAN YOG athletes were invited as torchbearers for that day.

==== Day 6, 13 August ====
The last day of the relay saw the torch going through the shopping and commercial districts of Singapore, visiting Jalan Besar, Arts District (Victoria Street, North Bridge Road), Chinatown, Tiong Bahru, Telok Blangah, Bukit Merah, Orchard, Rochor, Bras Basah, City Hall, Shenton Way and ending off at Marina Bay. This day saw the most number of notable persons as torchbearers, including Alexander Popov, Yelena Isinbayeva, JJ Lin, Sergey Bubka and Ng Ser Miang. Singapore's YOG chef de mission James Wong and Day 3 star, Low Wei Jie held the torch during the relay as well.

The relay was brought to an end by Minister Mentor Lee Kuan Yew at Premontory@Marina Bay, after the second boat crossing of the relay from the Merlion.

== Complete route ==
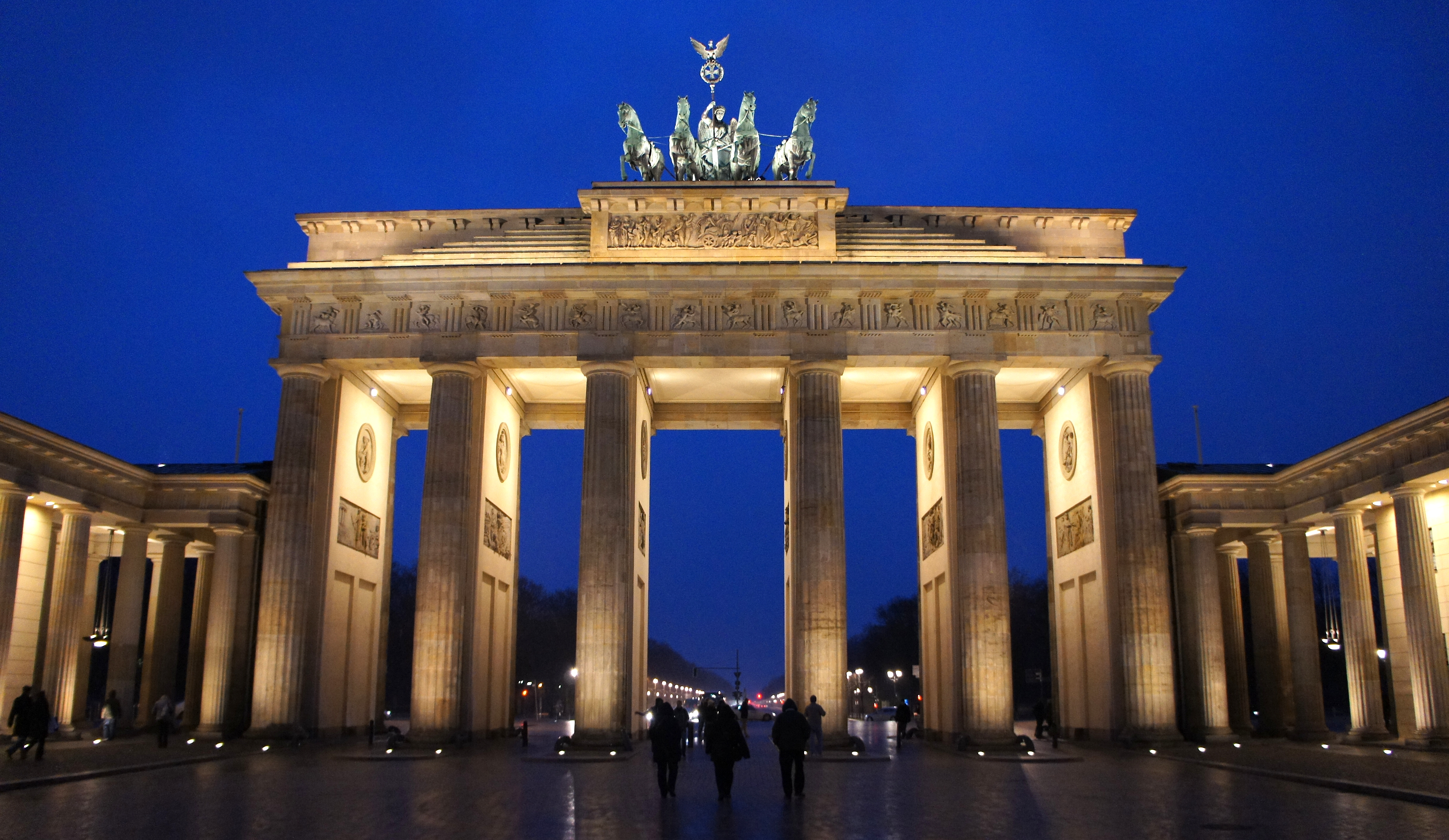
The Brandenburg Gate in Berlin, Germany, one of Europe's most famous landmarks.

The World Peace Gate in the Olympic Park of Seoul, South Korea.

The tables below show the route taken by the torch during the international leg and the domestic leg.

International torch relay route
Date	City	Represented continent	Major landmarks
23 July	Ancient Olympia, Greece	—	Temple of Hera
24 July	Berlin, Germany	Europe	Siemensstadt; Pariser Platz; Brandenburg Gate; Spree River; Haus der Kulturen der Welt
25 July	Dakar, Senegal	Africa	Yoff; Goree Island; Place de l'Obélisque
27 July — 28 July	Mexico City, Mexico	Americas	Universidad Iberoamericana; Los Pinos; La Ford; Ecoguarda Centre; Hidalgo Garden; El Ángel de la Independencia; Zócalo
2 August	Auckland, New Zealand	Oceania	Manukau Civic Centre Gallery; Telstra Centre
4 August	Seoul, South Korea	Asia	Olympic Park; Jam-Sil Stadium; Hannam Bridge (Han River); Mizy Seoul Centre; Cheonggye Square; Gwanghwamun Square

Singaporean route

Domestic torch relay route
Date	Region	Neighbourhoods/Areas covered	Celebration sites
6 August (Flame arrival celebrations)	—	—	National University of Singapore
7 August	Central (North)	Bishan, Toa Payoh, Ang Mo Kio	Nanyang Polytechnic
8 August	South East	Potong Pasir, Serangoon, Paya Lebar, Bedok, Eunos, Joo Chiat, Marine Parade, Simei	ITE College East
10 August	North East	Punggol, Sengkang, Hougang, Pasir Ris, Tampines	Temasek Polytechnic
11 August	North West	Bukit Timah, Holland, Bukit Panjang, Yishun, Sembawang, Woodlands	Republic Polytechnic
12 August	South West	Jurong, Boon Lay, Bukit Batok, Choa Chu Kang, West Coast, Clementi, Dover, Buona Vista	Singapore Polytechnic
13 August	Central (South)	Jalan Besar, Arts District (Victoria Street, North Bridge Road), Chinatown, Tiong Bahru, Telok Blangah, Bukit Merah, Orchard, Rochor, Bras Basah, City Hall, Shenton Way, Marina Bay	Marina Bay Promenade

== Reaction ==
Ministry of Community Development, Youth and Sports Dr Vivian Balakrishnan commented that he was surprised by the amount of support given at the grassroots level during the relay. Deputy Prime Minister Teo Chee Hean felt that the turnout along the relay route reflected strong support for the games by Singapore citizens.

== See also ==
- 2010 Winter Olympics torch relay
- List of Olympic torch relays
