= Macarena Errázuriz =

Chilean footballer

Personal information
- Full name: Macarena Errázuriz Sotta
- Date of birth: 7 March 1995 (age 31)
- Place of birth: Santiago, Chile
- Position: Centre-back

Youth career
- Universidad Católica

College career
Years	Team	Apps	(Gls)
2015–2017	LSUA Generals		
2017–2019	GGC Grizzlies	40	(6)

Senior career*
Years	Team	Apps	(Gls)
2010–2014	Universidad Católica		
2015	Universidad de Chile		
2019	Universidad Católica		
2021–2023	Municipal		

International career
2010	Chile U15		
2012	Chile U17		
Medal record
Women's football
Representing Chile
Summer Youth Olympics
Gold medal – first place	2010 Singapore	Team
- * Club domestic league appearances and goals

Macarena Errázuriz Sotta (born 7 March 1995) is a Chilean football player who plays as a centre-back.

== Club career ==
Errázuriz began playing football at early age along with her male relatives and neighbours, also in amateur summer championships. In 2010, she tried with the Chile national team as a free agent, joining the women's team of Universidad Católica in the same year, playing for them for five seasons.

In 2015, she played for Universidad de Chile and, subsequently, she emigrated to study to the United States and represented the soccer teams of LSUA Generals and GGC Grizzlies.

Back in Chile in 2019, she rejoined Universidad Católica for four months.

In 2021, she moved to Guatemala and joined the recently started women's team of Municipal, recommended by her friend Daniela Andrade. In 2023, she coincided with her compatriot Javiera Roa. She left the team in August 2023 due to a serious injury in the right foot.

== International career ==
Errázuriz represented the Chile under-15 team that won the gold medal in the 2010 Summer Youth Olympics.

In 2012, she represented the under-17's in the South American Championship.

At under-20 level, she was in the preliminary squad for the 2014 South American Championship alongside teammates such as Isidora Hernández and Leticia Torres.

== Honours ==
Chile U15

- Summer Youth Olympics Gold medal: 2010
