= Football at the 2010 Summer Youth Olympics – Girls' tournament =

2010 Girls' Youth Olympic Football Tournament

Tournament details
- Host country: Singapore
- Dates: 12–24 August 2010 (12 days)
- Teams: 6 (from 6 confederations)
- Venue: 1 (in 1 host city)

Final positions
- Champions: Chile (1st title)
- Runners-up: Equatorial Guinea
- Third place: Turkey
- Fourth place: Iran

Tournament statistics
- Matches played: 11
- Goals scored: 36 (3.27 per match)
- Attendance: 20,174 (1,834 per match)
- Top scorer(s): (Equatorial Guinea) Felicidad Avomo (Equatorial Guinea) Judit Ndong (5 goals)

Football at the 2010 Summer Youth Olympics took place at the Jalan Besar Stadium in Singapore.

== Venue ==
The Jalan Besar Stadium (Singapore) will host the women's soccer tournament. The stadium was inaugurated in 1932 and currently has a capacity of 6,000 spectators. Since 2008 it has been equipped with an artificial surface.

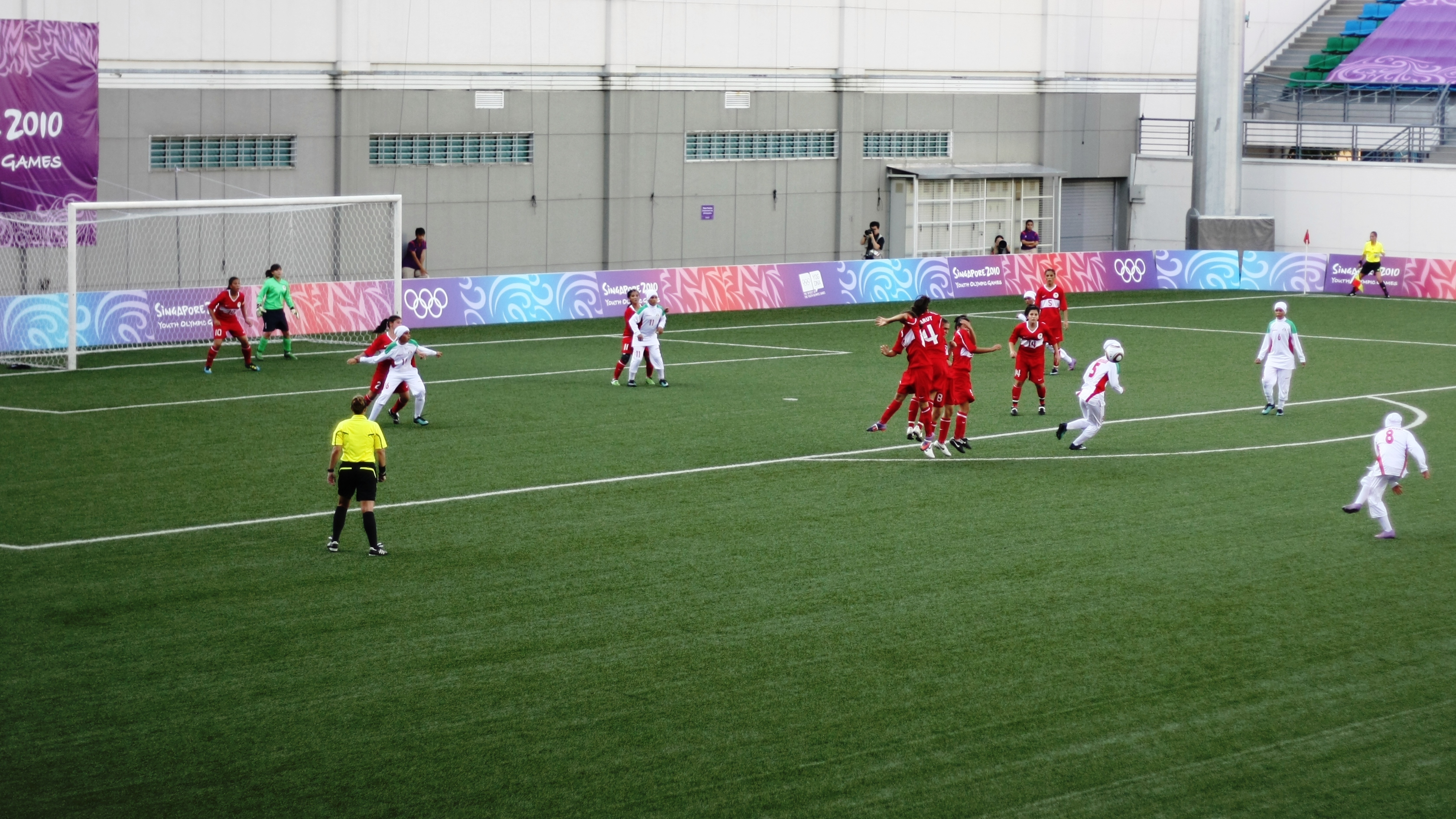
Iran Vs Turkey

== Medalists ==
Gold	Silver	Bronze
Chile	Equatorial Guinea	Turkey

== Preliminary round ==
=== Group A ===
Team	Pld	W	D	L	GF	GA	GD	Pts
Turkey	2	2	0	0	8	2	+6	6
Iran	2	1	0	1	3	4	−1	3
Papua New Guinea	2	0	0	2	0	5	−5	0

12 August 2010
18:00

Turkey	4–2	Iran
Karatas 6'; Adeli 67' (o.g.); Serin 70'; Aydin 80+2'	Report	Duran 13' (o.g.); Aflaki 16'

Jalan Besar Stadium, Singapore
Attendance: 2,493
Referee: Michelle Pye (Canada)

15 August 2010
18:00

Iran	1–0	Papua New Guinea
Ardestani 43'	Report

Jalan Besar Stadium, Singapore
Attendance: 827
Referee: Kateryna Monzul (Ukraine)

18 August 2010
18:00

Papua New Guinea	0–4	Turkey
	Report	Duran 6'; Başkol 52'; Aytop 80+1', 80+3'

Jalan Besar Stadium, Singapore
Attendance: 1,380
Referee: Therese Raissa Neguel (Cameroon)

=== Group B ===
Team	Pld	W	D	L	GF	GA	GD	Pts
Equatorial Guinea	2	2	0	0	7	2	+5	6
Chile	2	1	0	1	2	4	−2	3
Trinidad and Tobago	2	0	0	2	1	4	−3	0

12 August 2010
20:45

Chile	1–0	Trinidad and Tobago
Rodriguez 80'	Report

Jalan Besar Stadium, Singapore
Attendance: 2,493
Referee: Pannipar Kamnueng (Thailand)

15 August 2010
20:45

Trinidad and Tobago	1–3	Equatorial Guinea
Prescott 64'	Report	Avomo 7', 40+1'; V. Nchama 59'

Jalan Besar Stadium, Singapore
Attendance: 827
Referee: Gabriela Bandeira (Uruguay)

18 August 2010
20:45

Equatorial Guinea	4–1	Chile
Ndong 12', 68'; Avomo 80', 80+2'	Report	Orellana 35'

Jalan Besar Stadium, Singapore
Attendance: 1,547
Referee: Sandra Braz (Portugal)

== Semi-finals ==
21 August 2010
18:00

Turkey	2–3	Chile
Baskol 37'; Akarsu 40'	Report	Armijo 20'; Rodríguez 26'; Navarrete 80+4'

Jalan Besar Stadium, Singapore
Attendance: 2,315
Referee: Pannipar Kamnueng (Thailand)

21 August 2010
20:45

Equatorial Guinea	4–1	Iran
Biyogo 32'; Avomo 36'; Ndong 56' (pen.) 66'	Report	Ardestani 46'

Jalan Besar Stadium, Singapore
Attendance: 2,707
Referee: Sandra Braz (Portugal)

== 5th-place match ==
23 August 2010
18:00

Papua New Guinea	0–0	Trinidad and Tobago
	Report
Penalties
Steven (penalty missed); Morris (penalty scored); Obi (penalty missed); Kaikas (penalty scored)	2–4	Warrick (penalty scored); Asson (penalty scored); Jacob (penalty scored); Sequea (penalty scored)

Jalan Besar Stadium, Singapore
Attendance: 1,615
Referee: Gabriela Bandeira (Uruguay)

== Bronze-medal match ==
24 August 2010
18:00

Turkey	3–0	Iran
Baskol 3'; Akarsu 51'; Serin 71'	Report

Jalan Besar Stadium, Singapore
Attendance: 1,970
Referee: Michelle Pye (Canada)

== Final ==
24 August 2010
20:45

Chile	1–1	Equatorial Guinea
Orellana 25'	Report	Ndong 55' (pen.)
Penalties
Navarrete (penalty scored); Rodríguez (penalty scored); Roa (penalty scored); González Parra (penalty scored); Orellana (penalty scored)	5–3	Ndong (penalty scored); V. Nchama (penalty scored); Nguema (penalty scored); Obiang (penalty missed)

Jalan Besar Stadium, Singapore
Attendance: 2,000
Referee: Kateryna Monzul (Ukraine)

== Final ranking ==
Rank	Team
1st place, gold medalist(s)	Chile
2nd place, silver medalist(s)	Equatorial Guinea
3rd place, bronze medalist(s)	Turkey
4	Iran
5	Trinidad and Tobago
6	Papua New Guinea

== Goalscorers ==
5 goals

- (Equatorial Guinea) Felicidad Avomo
- (Equatorial Guinea) Judit Ndong

3 goals

- (Turkey) Hilal Başkol

2 goals

- (Chile) Romina Orellana
- (Chile) Melisa Rodríguez
- (Iran) Fatemeh Ardestani
- (Turkey) Dilan Akarsu
- (Turkey) Nazmiye Aytop
- (Turkey) Feride Serin

1 goal

- (Chile) Francisca Armijo
- (Chile) María Navarrete
- (Equatorial Guinea) Leticia Nchama Biyogo
- (Equatorial Guinea) Verónica Nchama
- (Iran) Shahin Aflaki
- (Trinidad and Tobago) Brittaney Prescott
- (Turkey) Kubra Aydin
- (Turkey) Eda Duran
- (Turkey) Eda Karatas

Own Goal (1 goal)

- (Iran) Fatemeh Adeli for Turkey
- (Turkey) Eda Duran for Iran
