= 2010 Olympics torch relay =

2010 Olympics torch relay may refer to:

- 2010 Winter Olympics torch relay, part of the 2010 Winter Olympics held in Vancouver, British Columbia, Canada
  - 2010 Winter Olympics torch relay route, the route taken by the torch relay
- 2010 Summer Youth Olympics torch relay, part of the 2010 Summer Youth Olympics held in Singapore
