= Montserratt Grau =

Chilean footballer (born 1995)

Personal information
- Full name: Montserratt Grau Rodas
- Date of birth: 12 October 1995 (age 31)
- Place of birth: Santiago, Chile
- Position: Midfielder

College career
Years	Team	Apps	(Gls)
2017–2018	OVU Fighting Scots		

Senior career*
Years	Team	Apps	(Gls)
2010–2013	Colo-Colo		
2014–2016	Universidad de Chile		
2019	Universidad de Chile		
2019–2020	Murcia Féminas		
2020–2022	Universidad de Chile		
2022	Ultrasolas CEE (futsal)		
2023	Magallanes		

International career
2010	Chile U15		
2011	Chile		
2012	Chile U17		
2012	Chile U20		
2023	Chile (homeless)		
Medal record
Women's football
Representing Chile
Summer Youth Olympics
Gold medal – first place	2010 Singapore	Team
- * Club domestic league appearances and goals

Montserratt Grau Rodas (born 12 October 1995), usually written as Montserrat Grau, is a Chilean former footballer who played as a midfielder.

== Club career ==
Grau began playing football at the age of seven. At professional level, she began her career with Colo-Colo. In 2014, she switched to Universidad de Chile, playing for them in three different stints: 2014–2016, 2019 and 2020–2022. At the end of the 2015 season, she was honored with the Espíritu Universidad de Chile (Spirit of University of Chile) award as the best teammate.

In 2017–18, she had a stint with the OVU Fighting Scots in the United States, the association football team of Ohio Valley University, becoming one of the two team captains.

In 2019, she moved to Spain and signed with Murcia Féminas.

In the second half of 2022, she was a member of the futsal club based in Santiago, Ultrasolas CEE.

In 2023, she joined Magallanes.

In February 2024, she announced her retirement.

== International career ==
Grau was the team captain of the Chile under-15 team that won the gold medal in the 2010 Summer Youth Olympics.

In 2011, she represented the Chile senior team.

In 2012, she represented the under-17's in the South American Championship.

In 2014, she represented the under-20's in the South American Championship.

In 2023, she represented the Chile team in the Homeless World Cup, becoming the runner up.

== Other works ==
She has worked as a football commentator for Zona Latina channel about the 2021 Copa Libertadores Femenina and ESPN.

== Honours ==
Chile U15

- Summer Youth Olympics Gold medal: 2010
