= Venues of the 2010 Summer Youth Olympics =

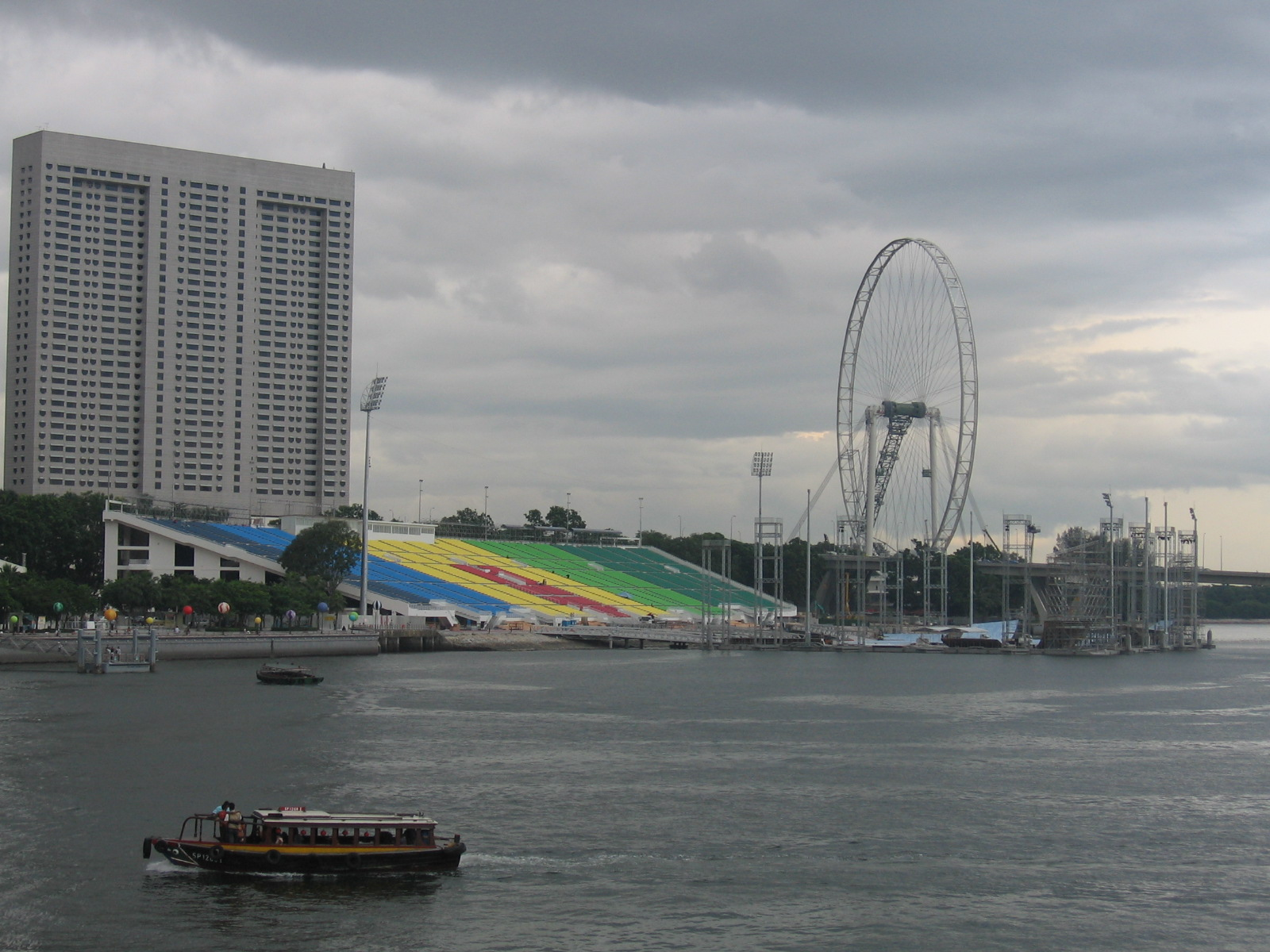
The Float@Marina Bay, a 25,000-seater floating platform, hosted the opening and closing ceremonies.

The 2010 Summer Youth Olympics were held in Singapore from 14 to 26 August 2010. A total of 3,600 athletes from 204 National Olympic Committees (NOCs) participated in 201 events in 26 sports. (Note: Although the Singapore 2010 official website listed the number of National Olympic Committees (NOCs) participating at 205 (all NOCs that exist as of 2010), the Kuwait Olympic Committee was in fact banned in January and was thus not allowed to participate.) Events took place at eighteen competition venues, of which eleven were pre-existing venues, one was newly constructed for the Olympics, and six were temporary venues that would be removed following the Games. Another twelve venues were set aside for training purposes. The Youth Olympic Village was a separate non-competitive venue that provided accommodation and activities for the athletes.

The Singapore Youth Olympic Games Organising Committee (SYOGOC) organised the Games, which the city-state of Singapore won the bid to host on 21 February 2008. The Singapore Turf Club Riding Centre was the only venue constructed for the Games. Certain venues such as the Singapore Indoor Stadium and The Float@Marina Bay were temporarily converted to host certain sports and events, while the Kallang Field was upgraded to be able to host the archery competition.

The Float@Marina Bay, the world's largest floating stage, was the main venue for the Games, hosting the opening and closing ceremonies. It was also the largest venue in terms of seating capacity at the Games, capable of holding 25,000 spectators. The 55,000-seater National Stadium was not used as it was undergoing demolition to make way for Singapore Sports Hub, which houses the new National Stadium, expected to open after the Games. Discounting venues which do not have spectator seating such as the National Sailing Centre, the smallest venue in terms of seating capacity was the Kallang Field which could hold 500.

== Competition venues ==
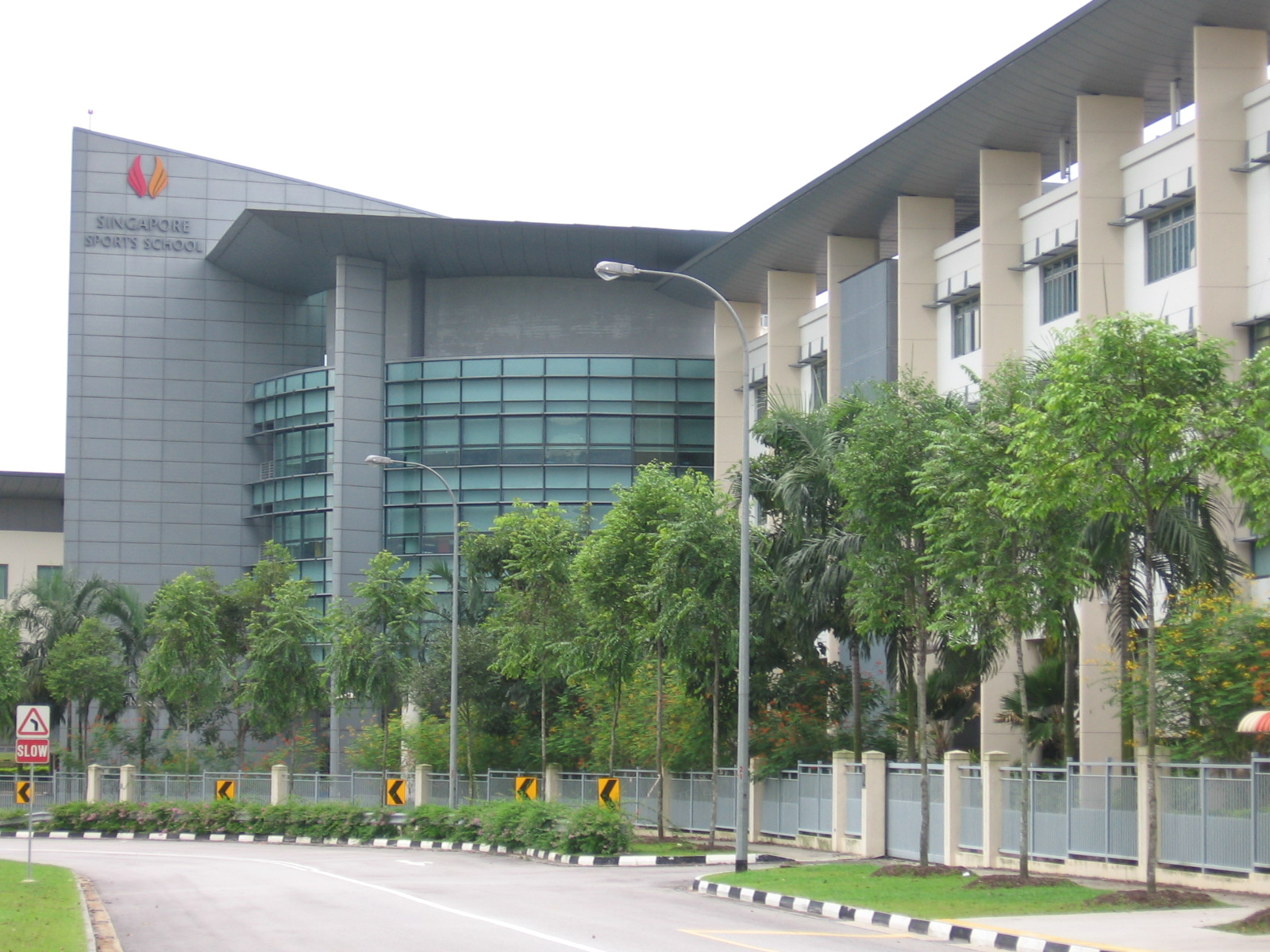
The Singapore Sports School, which hosted three sports, is a specialised independent school for athletes.

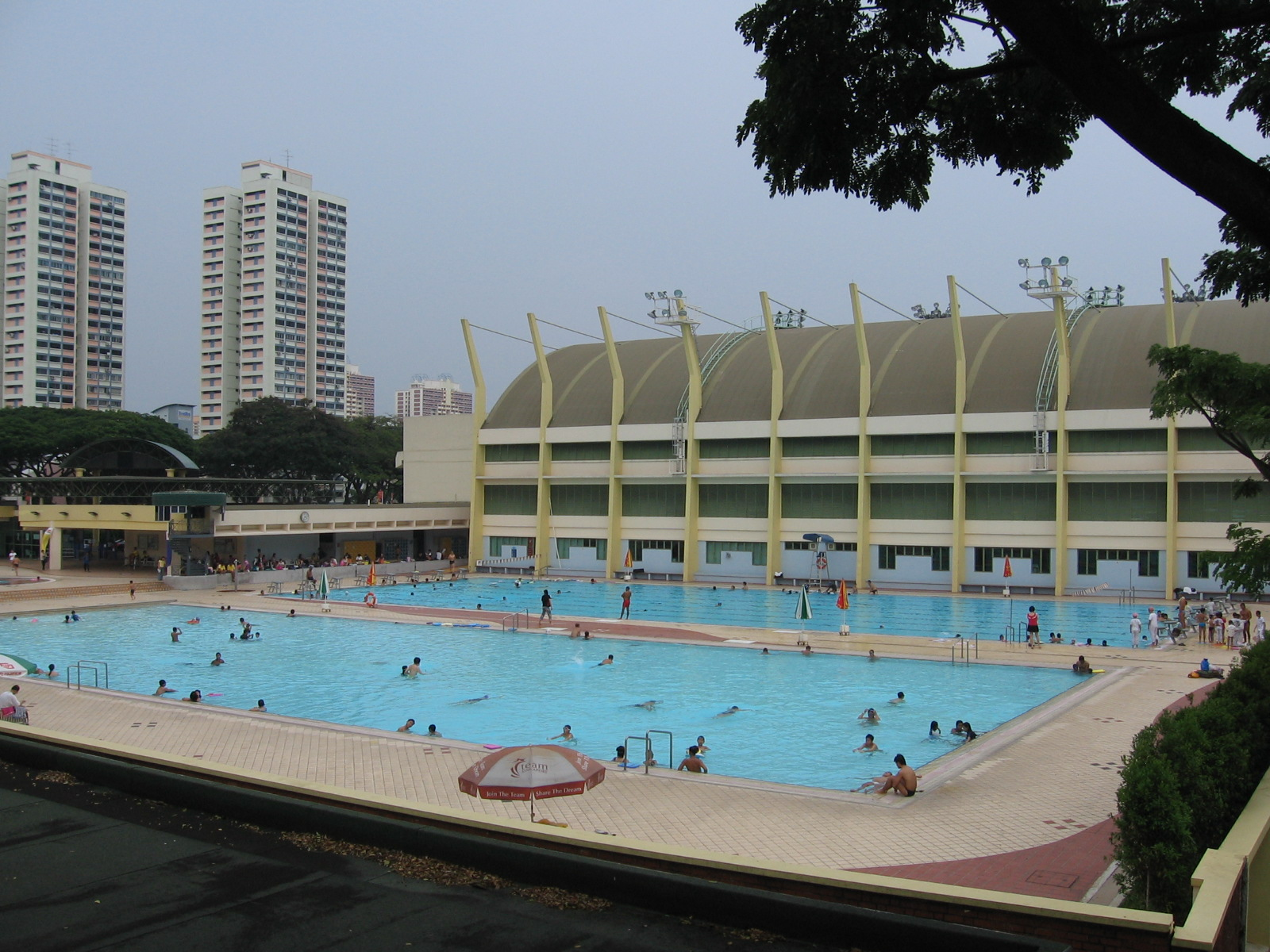
The Toa Payoh Swimming Complex hosted the diving competition at the Games.

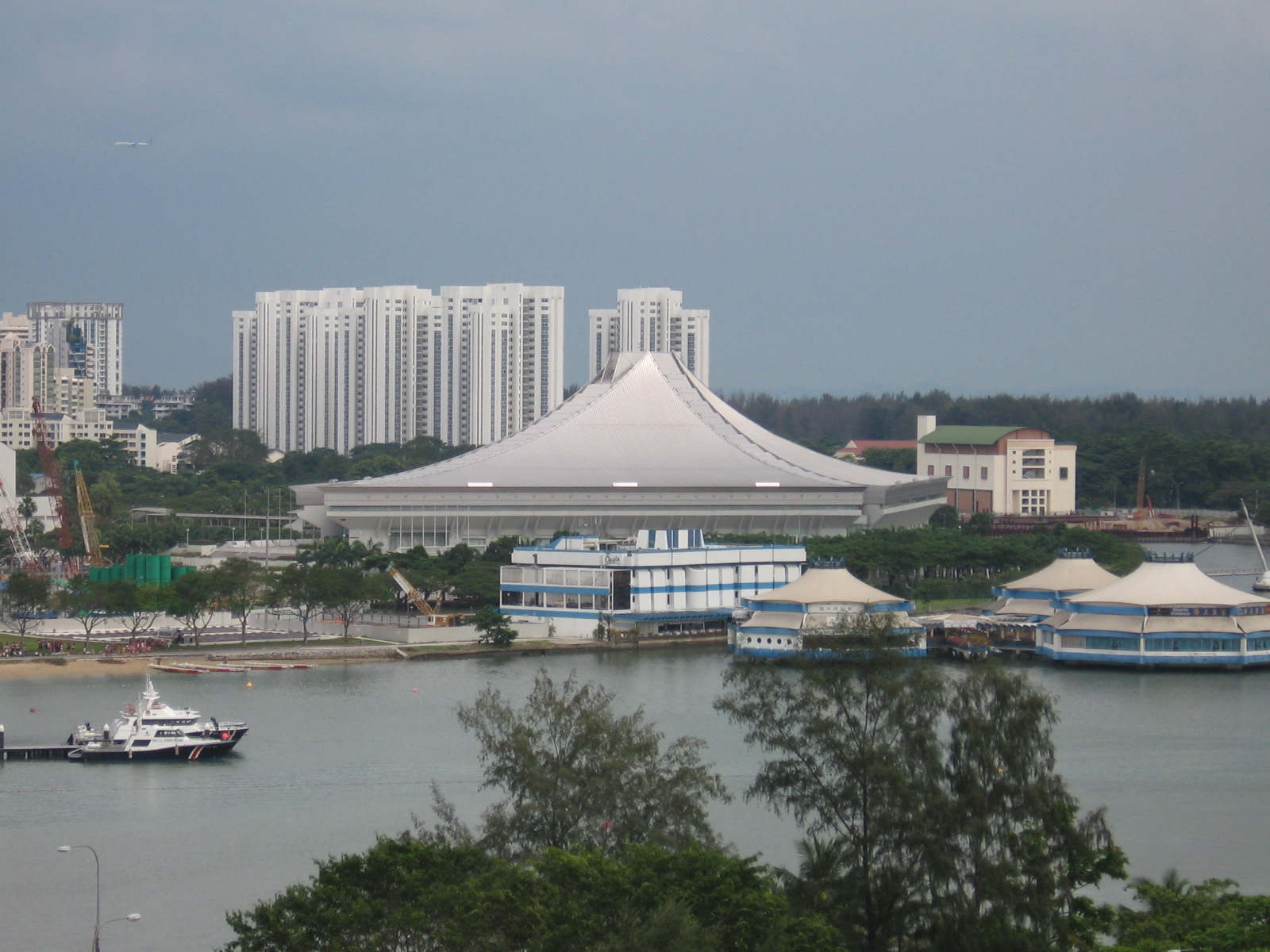
Badminton and table tennis were held at the Singapore Indoor Stadium.

Venue	Sports	Capacity	Type	Ref.
*scape (Note: *scape is a public space in the downtown of Singapore dedicated to youth and their activities.)	Basketball	1,000	Temporary	
Bishan Sports Hall	Gymnastics	1,920	Existing	
Bishan Stadium	Athletics	4,100	Existing	
East Coast Park	Triathlon	N/A	Temporary	
International Convention Centre	Boxing, fencing, handball, judo, taekwondo, wrestling	1,000–1,500	Temporary	
Jalan Besar Stadium	Football	6,000	Existing	
Kallang Field	Archery	500	Existing	
Kallang Tennis Centre	Tennis	2,000	Existing	
Marina Reservoir	Canoeing, rowing	1,000	Temporary	
National Sailing Centre	Sailing	N/A	Existing	
Sengkang Hockey Stadium	Field hockey	1,000	Existing	
Singapore Indoor Stadium	Badminton, table tennis	5,000	Existing	
Singapore Sports School	Modern pentathlon, shooting, swimming	300–1,800	Existing	
Singapore Turf Club Riding Centre	Equestrian	1,500	New	
Tampines Bike Park	Cycling	N/A	Temporary	
The Float@Marina Bay	Cycling	25,000	Existing	
Toa Payoh Sports Hall	Volleyball, weightlifting	2,000	Existing	
Toa Payoh Swimming Complex	Diving	800	Existing	

== Training venues ==
All training venues listed here existed before the Youth Olympics. Sports which are not listed had their training at the respective competition venues.

Venue	Sports
Catholic High School	Gymnastics
Choa Chu Kang Stadium	Football
Jurong East Sports Hall	Volleyball
Jurong East Stadium	Football
Jurong West Sports Hall	Handball
Jurong West Stadium	Football
Jurong West Swimming Complex	Swimming
National University of Singapore	Table tennis, taekwondo, wrestling
Ngee Ann Polytechnic	Football
Raffles Institution (Junior College)	Gymnastics
Raffles Institution (Secondary)	Gymnastics
Singapore Polytechnic	Badminton, football
Youth Olympic Village (Nanyang Technological University, National Institute of Education)	Athletics, basketball, boxing, fencing, field hockey, football, handball, judo, taekwondo, tennis, triathlon, swimming, weightlifting

== Youth Olympic Village ==
The Youth Olympic Village (YOV) of the Games housed over 5,000 athletes and team officials from 10 to 28 August 2010. Located in Nanyang Technological University (NTU), it was divided into two zones: the Residential Zone and the Village Square. The Residential Zone consisted of NTU's ten Halls of Residence, namely Halls 3 and 8 to 16. While two of the halls (Halls 3 and 16) were recently completed, most were existing halls with students who were forced to move out temporarily to make way for the event. The Village Square included the World Culture Village, which itself held performances, educational programmes, retail outlets, currency exchangers, and a post office. It was made to serve as a congregating area for the athletes.

The YOV served as accommodation and a preparation point for the Games, and it also hosted specially designed cultural and educational activities for the athletes. On 7 June 2010, it was announced that Parliamentary Secretary and SYOGOC advisor Teo Ser Luck, former national sprinter Canagasabai Kunalan and former national swimmer Joscelin Yeo were appointed as the Village Mayor and Deputy Village Mayors respectively.

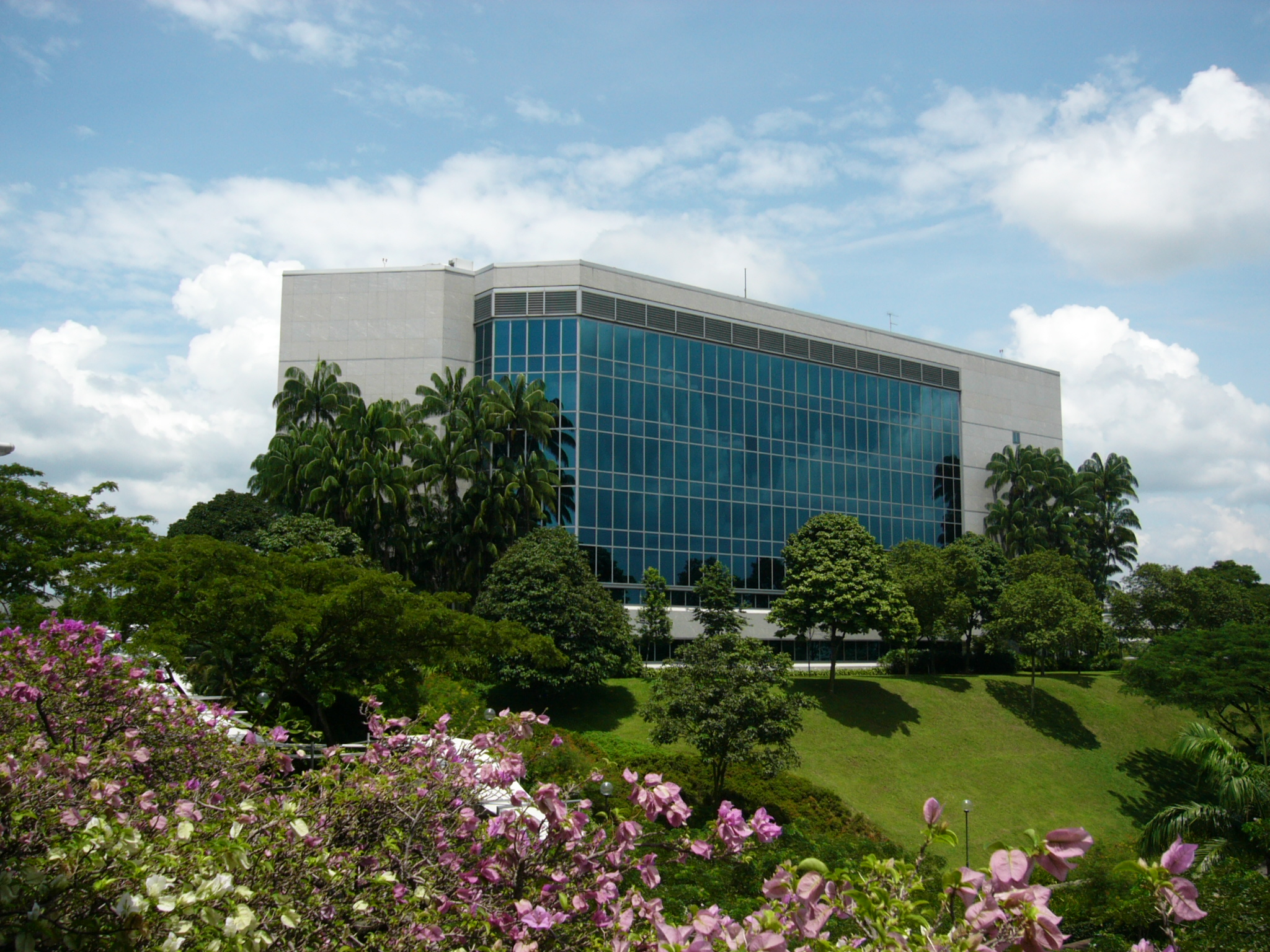
Administration Building of Nanyang Technological University, which is the site of the first Youth Olympic Village

The International Olympic Committee (IOC) specified that all members of a National Olympic Committee team delegation had to stay overnight within the Youth Olympic Village for the duration of the Games, regardless of their competition schedules, "and shall participate in both sports competitions and in the culture and education programmes." IOC president Jacques Rogge stressed the need for athletes to enjoy their time at the Games and that "there should not be a gravity that you have at the traditional Games [sic] that's for later." The senior Olympic Games in contrast allow athletes and teams to leave the Games once their competition schedule has ended.

Initial plans were for the YOV to be sited at the National University of Singapore's University Town, which was under construction. However, rising construction costs worldwide as cited by the SYOGOC prompted a shift to NTU. The new US$423 million (S$598 million) construction project at NTU commenced work in 2008 and was completed in 2010. The Straits Times announced in July 2010 that hydrogen-electric hybrid buses would be used to ferry participants around the YOV, being among the first green buses to be used in Singapore. A sculpture, titled The Wind and Wings, was specially made to commemorate the world's first Youth Olympic Village. It was unveiled by president of Singapore S. R. Nathan on 1 August 2010. The sculpture was made up of three tonnes of stainless steel and was sculpted by artist Yeo Chee Kiong.
