= Chile at the 2010 Summer Youth Olympics =

- IOC code: CHI
- NOC: Chilean Olympic Committee
- Website: www.coc.org.co (in Spanish)

in Singapore
- Competitors: 50 in 10 sports
- Flag bearer: Laura Munizaga
- Medals Ranked 50th: Gold 1 Silver 0 Bronze 0 Total 1

Summer Youth Olympics appearances
- 2010; 2014; 2018; 2026

Chile participated in the 2010 Summer Youth Olympics in Singapore.

== Medalists ==
Medal	Name	Sport	Event	Date
Gold	Chile Girls' Football team: Gabriela Aguayo; Leslie Alarcón; Francisca Armijo; Julissa Barrera; Katherin Cisternas; Macarena Errázuriz; Fernanda Geroldi; Catalina González; Constanza González; Montserratt Grau; Paola Hinojosa; María Fernanda Navarrete; Romina Orellana; Javiera Roa; Melisa Rodríguez; Karina Sepúlveda; Javiera Valencia; Macarena Vásquez	Football	Girls' tournament	24 Aug

== Athletics ==
=== Boys ===
Track and Road Events

Athletes	Event	Qualification		Final	
Athletes	Event	Result	Rank	Result	Rank
Alejandro Peirano	Boys’ 1000m	2:31.96	15 qB	2:28.58	14

Field Events

Athletes	Event	Qualification		Final	
Athletes	Event	Result	Rank	Result	Rank
Joaquín Ballivián	Boys’ Shot Put	19.60	8 Q	20.36	6

=== Girls ===
Track and Road Events

Athletes	Event	Qualification		Final	
Athletes	Event	Result	Rank	Result	Rank
Macarena Borie	Girls’ 100m	12.52	14 qB	12.41	13

== Basketball ==
Girls

Squad List	Event	Group Stage		Placement Stage			Rank
Squad List	Event	Group D	Rank	17th-20th			Rank
Dayanne Garcia; Estefania Vasquez; Katalina Garcia; Francisca Salvatierra (C)	Girls' Basketball	Australia; L 9-18	5	Thailand; L 13-24	Vanuatu; W 17-13	Singapore; W 16-15	18
Dayanne Garcia; Estefania Vasquez; Katalina Garcia; Francisca Salvatierra (C)	Girls' Basketball	France; L 15-30	5	Thailand; L 13-24	Vanuatu; W 17-13	Singapore; W 16-15	18
Dayanne Garcia; Estefania Vasquez; Katalina Garcia; Francisca Salvatierra (C)	Girls' Basketball	Japan; L 17-24	5	Thailand; L 13-24	Vanuatu; W 17-13	Singapore; W 16-15	18
Dayanne Garcia; Estefania Vasquez; Katalina Garcia; Francisca Salvatierra (C)	Girls' Basketball	Italy; L 8-21	5	Thailand; L 13-24	Vanuatu; W 17-13	Singapore; W 16-15	18

== Cycling ==
Cross Country

Athlete	Event	Time	Points	Rank
Nicolas Prudencio Flano	Boys’ Cross Country	1:02:25	58	11
Laura Munizaga Holloway	Girls’ Cross Country	50:24	15	5

Time Trial

Athlete	Event	Time	Points	Rank
Edison Bravo Mansilla	Boys’ Time Trial	4:13.30	27	14
Laura Munizaga Holloway	Girls’ Time Trial	3:30.12	15	5

BMX

Athlete	Event	Seeding Round		Quarterfinals							Semifinals							Final		
Athlete	Event	Seeding Round		Run 1		Run 2		Run 3		Rank	Run 1		Run 2		Run 3		Rank	Final		
Athlete	Event	Time	Rank	Time	Rank	Time	Rank	Time	Rank	Rank	Time	Rank	Time	Rank	Time	Rank	Rank	Time	Points	Rank
Ignacio Cruz Ormeno	Boys’ BMX	32.973	11	34.462	5	32.827	3	33.447	4	4 Q	1:45.41	7	59.575	7	36.116	3	7	64		13
Laura Munizaga Holloway	Girls’ BMX	42.349	9	41.232	2	41.231	3	41.273	3	3 Q	41.518	5	41.086	5	40.514	5	5	27		9

Road Race

Athlete	Event	Time	Points	Rank
Edison Bravo Mansilla	Boys’ Road Race	1:05:44	56	12
Nicolas Prudencio Flano	Boys’ Road Race	1:14:02		55
Ignacio Cruz Ormeno	Boys’ Road Race	1:24:04		78

Overall

Team	Event	Cross Country Pts		Time Trial Pts		BMX Pts		Road Race Pts	Total	Rank
Team	Event	Boys	Girls	Boys	Girls	Boys	Girls	Road Race Pts	Total	Rank
Laura Munizaga Holloway; Nicolas Prudencio Flano; Edison Bravo Mansilla; Ignacio Cruz Ormeno	Mixed Team	58	15	27	15	64	27	56*	262	10

- * Received -5 for finishing road race with all three racers

== Equestrian ==
Athlete	Horse	Event	Round 1			Round 2			Total	Jump-Off		Rank
Athlete	Horse	Event	Penalties		Rank	Penalties		Rank	Total	Penalties	Time	Rank
Athlete	Horse	Event	Jump	Time	Rank	Jump	Time	Rank	Total	Penalties	Time	Rank
Alberto Schwalm	Stoneleigh Eddie	Individual Jumping	16	0	27	4	0	8	20			23
Guilherme Foroni (BRA); Maria Victoria Paz (ARG); Alberto Schwalm (CHI); Mario Gamboa (COL); Marcelo Chirico (URU)	The Hec Man; Glen Haven Accolade; Stoneleigh Eddie; LH Titan; Links Hot Gossip	Team Jumping	~~16~~; ~~12~~; 8; 4; 0	~~0~~; ~~0~~; 0; 0; 0	4	0; ~~16~~; ~~16~~; 0; 4	0; ~~0~~; ~~0~~; 0; 0	2	16			5

== Football ==
=== Girls ===
Squad List	Event	Group Stage		Semifinal	Final	Rank
Squad List	Event	Group B	Rank	Semifinal	Final	Rank
Paola Hinojosa; María Fernanda Navarrete; Javiera Valencia; Francisca Armijo; Leslie Alarcón; Julissa Barrera; Gabriela Aguayo; Catalina González; Melisa Rodríguez; Montserratt Grau (C); Javiera Roa; Karina Sepúlveda; Katherin Cisternas; Romina Orellana; Fernanda Geroldi; Constanza González; Macarena Vásquez; Macarena Errázuriz	Girls' Football	Trinidad and Tobago; W 1-0	2 Q	Turkey; W 3-2	Equatorial Guinea; W 1-1; PSO 5-3	Gold medal
Paola Hinojosa; María Fernanda Navarrete; Javiera Valencia; Francisca Armijo; Leslie Alarcón; Julissa Barrera; Gabriela Aguayo; Catalina González; Melisa Rodríguez; Montserratt Grau (C); Javiera Roa; Karina Sepúlveda; Katherin Cisternas; Romina Orellana; Fernanda Geroldi; Constanza González; Macarena Vásquez; Macarena Errázuriz	Girls' Football	Equatorial Guinea; L 1-4	2 Q	Turkey; W 3-2	Equatorial Guinea; W 1-1; PSO 5-3	Gold medal

=== Group B ===
Team	Pld	W	D	L	GF	GA	GD	Pts
Equatorial Guinea	2	2	0	0	7	2	+5	6
Chile	2	1	0	1	2	4	−2	3
Trinidad and Tobago	2	0	0	2	1	4	−3	0

12 August 2010
20:45

Chile	1–0	Trinidad and Tobago
Rodriguez 80'	Report

Jalan Besar Stadium, Singapore
Attendance: 2,493
Referee: Pannipar Kamnueng (Thailand)

18 August 2010
20:45

Equatorial Guinea	4–1	Chile
Ndong 12', 68'; Avomo 80', 80+2'	Report	Orellana 35'

Jalan Besar Stadium, Singapore
Attendance: 1,547
Referee: Sandra Braz (Portugal)

=== Semi-finals ===
21 August 2010
18:00

Turkey	2–3	Chile
Baskol 37'; Akarsu 40'	Report	Armijo 20'; Rodriguez 26'; Navarrete 80+4'

Jalan Besar Stadium, Singapore
Attendance: 2,315
Referee: Pannipar Kamnueng (Thailand)

=== Final ===
24 August 2010
20:45

Chile	1–1	Equatorial Guinea
Orellana 25'	Report	Ndong 55' (pen.)
Penalties
Navarrete (penalty scored); Rodríguez (penalty scored); Roa (penalty scored); González Parra (penalty scored); Orellana (penalty scored)	5 – 3	Ndong (penalty scored); V. Nchama (penalty scored); Nguema (penalty scored); Obiang (penalty missed)

Jalan Besar Stadium, Singapore
Attendance: 2,000
Referee: Kateryna Monzul (Ukraine)

== Gymnastics ==
=== Artistic Gymnastics ===
Girls

Athlete	Event	Vault		Uneven Bars		Beam		Floor		Total	
Athlete	Event	Score	Rank	Score	Rank	Score	Rank	Score	Rank	Score	Rank
Camila Francesca Vilches Arancibia	Girls' Qualification	12.600	31	4.250	41	9.700	41	10.550	39	37.100	41

== Hockey ==
Squad List	Event	Group Stage		5th-place match	
Squad List	Event	Opposition Score	Rank	Opposition Score	Rank
Felix Schiegg; Rodrigo David; Manuel Becker; Carlos Lagos; Juan Pablo Purcell; Vicente Martin (C); Matias Mardones; Fernando Renz; Jose Pedro Maldonado; Felipe Tapia; Matias Koster; Valentin Arguindegui; Alan Hamilton; Gonzalo Prado; Francisco Pieper; Cristobal Contardo	Boys' Hockey	Belgium; L 0-9	5	Singapore; L 1-6	6
Felix Schiegg; Rodrigo David; Manuel Becker; Carlos Lagos; Juan Pablo Purcell; Vicente Martin (C); Matias Mardones; Fernando Renz; Jose Pedro Maldonado; Felipe Tapia; Matias Koster; Valentin Arguindegui; Alan Hamilton; Gonzalo Prado; Francisco Pieper; Cristobal Contardo	Boys' Hockey	Pakistan; L 1-15	5	Singapore; L 1-6	6
Felix Schiegg; Rodrigo David; Manuel Becker; Carlos Lagos; Juan Pablo Purcell; Vicente Martin (C); Matias Mardones; Fernando Renz; Jose Pedro Maldonado; Felipe Tapia; Matias Koster; Valentin Arguindegui; Alan Hamilton; Gonzalo Prado; Francisco Pieper; Cristobal Contardo	Boys' Hockey	Ghana; L 3-4	5	Singapore; L 1-6	6
Felix Schiegg; Rodrigo David; Manuel Becker; Carlos Lagos; Juan Pablo Purcell; Vicente Martin (C); Matias Mardones; Fernando Renz; Jose Pedro Maldonado; Felipe Tapia; Matias Koster; Valentin Arguindegui; Alan Hamilton; Gonzalo Prado; Francisco Pieper; Cristobal Contardo	Boys' Hockey	Singapore; W 2-1	5	Singapore; L 1-6	6
Felix Schiegg; Rodrigo David; Manuel Becker; Carlos Lagos; Juan Pablo Purcell; Vicente Martin (C); Matias Mardones; Fernando Renz; Jose Pedro Maldonado; Felipe Tapia; Matias Koster; Valentin Arguindegui; Alan Hamilton; Gonzalo Prado; Francisco Pieper; Cristobal Contardo	Boys' Hockey	Australia; L 0-9	5	Singapore; L 1-6	6

== Sailing ==
One Person Dinghy

Athlete	Event	Race												Points	Rank
Athlete	Event	1	2	3	4	5	6	7	8	9	10	11	M*	Points	Rank
Maria Poncell-Maurin	Girls' Byte CII	12	21	11	14	~~DSQ~~	25	~~26~~	15	17	24	17	17	173	22

== Swimming ==
Athletes	Event	Heat		Semifinal		Final	
Athletes	Event	Time	Position	Time	Position	Time	Position
Alan Wladimir Abarca Cortes	Boys' 50m Backstroke			DSQ		Did not advance	
Alan Wladimir Abarca Cortes	Boys' 100m Backstroke	1:01.71	28	Did not advance			
Alan Wladimir Abarca Cortes	Boys' 200m Backstroke	2:17.25	19			Did not advance	

== Triathlon ==
Girls

Triathlete	Event	Swimming	Transit 1	Cycling	Transit 2	Running	Total time	Rank
Andrea Longueira	Individual	10:02	0:36	31:41	0:30	20:53	1:03:42.88	12

Mixed

Athlete	Event	Total Times per Athlete (Swim 250 m, Bike 7 km, Run 1.7 km)	Total Group Time	Rank
Christine Ridenour (CAN); Luis Oliveros (MEX); Andrea Longueira (CHI); Juan Andrade (ECU)	Mixed Team Relay; Americas 2	20:21; 18:47; 23:07; 20:15	1:22:30.15	5
