= Haiti at the 2010 Summer Youth Olympics =

- IOC code: HAI
- NOC: Comité Olympique Haïtien

in Singapore
- Competitors: 22 in 4 sports
- Flag bearer: Peterson Sertune
- Medals Ranked 74th: Gold 0 Silver 1 Bronze 0 Total 1

Summer Youth Olympics appearances
- 2010; 2014; 2018

Haiti competed at the 2010 Summer Youth Olympics, the inaugural Youth Olympic Games, held in Singapore from 14 August to 26 August 2010.

== Medalists ==
Medal	Name	Sport	Event	Date
Silver	Haitian Boys' Football team: Jeff Alphonse; Wiliam Barthelemy; Junior Bonheur; Jean Bonhomme; Daniel Gedeon; Carlos Gluce; Ismael Hilaire; Whoopy Jean Baptiste; Sindy Louissaint; Nike Metellus; Jonathan Momplaisir; Jean Paraison; Jeff Petit Frere; Sandino Saint Jean; Sandro Saint Surin; Pierre Samedi; Robert Surpris; Bertrand Vilgrain	Football	Boys' tournament	25 Aug

== Athletics ==
=== Girls ===
Track and Road Events

Athletes	Event	Qualification		Final	
Athletes	Event	Result	Rank	Result	Rank
Beatrice Derose	Girls’ 1000m	4:10.68	30 qB	DNS	

== Football ==
Squad List	Event	Group Stage		Semifinal	Final	Rank
Squad List	Event	Group C	Rank	Semifinal	Final	Rank
Jeff Petit Frere; Daniel Gedeon (C); Sindy Louissaint; Jonathan Momplaisir; Nike Metellus; Wiliam Barthelemy; Carlos Gluce; Ismael Hilaire; Jean Paraison; Bertrand Vilgrain; Sandino Saint Jean; Pierre Samedi; Robert Surpris; Jean Bonhomme; Sandro Saint Surin; Whoopy Jean Baptiste; Junior Bonheur; Jeff Alphonse	Boys' Football	Bolivia; L 0-9	2 Q	Singapore; W 2-0	Bolivia; L 0-5	Silver medal
Jeff Petit Frere; Daniel Gedeon (C); Sindy Louissaint; Jonathan Momplaisir; Nike Metellus; Wiliam Barthelemy; Carlos Gluce; Ismael Hilaire; Jean Paraison; Bertrand Vilgrain; Sandino Saint Jean; Pierre Samedi; Robert Surpris; Jean Bonhomme; Sandro Saint Surin; Whoopy Jean Baptiste; Junior Bonheur; Jeff Alphonse	Boys' Football	Vanuatu; W 2-1	2 Q	Singapore; W 2-0	Bolivia; L 0-5	Silver medal

== Judo ==
Individual

Athlete	Event	Round 1	Round 2	Round 3	Semifinals	Final	Rank
Athlete	Event	Opposition Result	Opposition Result	Opposition Result	Opposition Result	Opposition Result	Rank
Dieulourdes Joseph	Girls' -44 kg	Damyanova (BUL); L 000-101	Repechage; Thakur (IND); L 000-101	did not advance			9
Wildjie Vertus	Girls' -63 kg	BYE	Matic (CRO); L 000-101	Repechage; Nemorin (MRI); L 001-010	did not advance		17

Team

Team	Event	Round 1	Round 2	Semifinals	Final	Rank
Team	Event	Opposition Result	Opposition Result	Opposition Result	Opposition Result	Rank
Chiba; Dieulourdes Joseph (HAI); Diau Bauro (FIJ); Alexandra Pop (ROU); Phuc Cai (DEN); Sophio Beridze (GEO); Rijad Dedeic (MNE); Ryosuke Igarashi (JPN)	Mixed Team	BYE	Essen; L 2-5	did not advance		5
Hamilton; Cynthia Rahming (BAH); Paolo Persoglia (SMR); Odette Giuffrida (ITA); Davit Ghazaryan (ARM); Wildjie Vertus (HAI); Jae Hyung Lee (KOR); Una Svetlana Tuba (SRB); Anis Shalabi (LBA)	Mixed Team	BYE	Cairo; L 4-4 (2-3)	did not advance		5

== Taekwondo ==
Athlete	Event	Preliminary	Quarterfinal	Semifinal	Final	Rank
Peterson Sertune	Boys' -55kg	Mohamed Asal (EGY); W DSQ	Keveh Rezaei (IRI); L RSC R1 0:55	did not advance		5
