= Football at the 2010 Summer Youth Olympics =

Tournament details
- Host country: Singapore
- Dates: 12–25 August 2010
- Teams: 6 (boys) + 6 (girls) (from 6 confederations)
- Venues: 2 (in 1 host city)

Final positions
- Champions: Bolivia (boys); Chile (girls)
- Runners-up: Haiti (boys); Equatorial Guinea (girls)
- Third place: Singapore (boys); Turkey (girls)
- Fourth place: Montenegro (boys); Iran (girls)

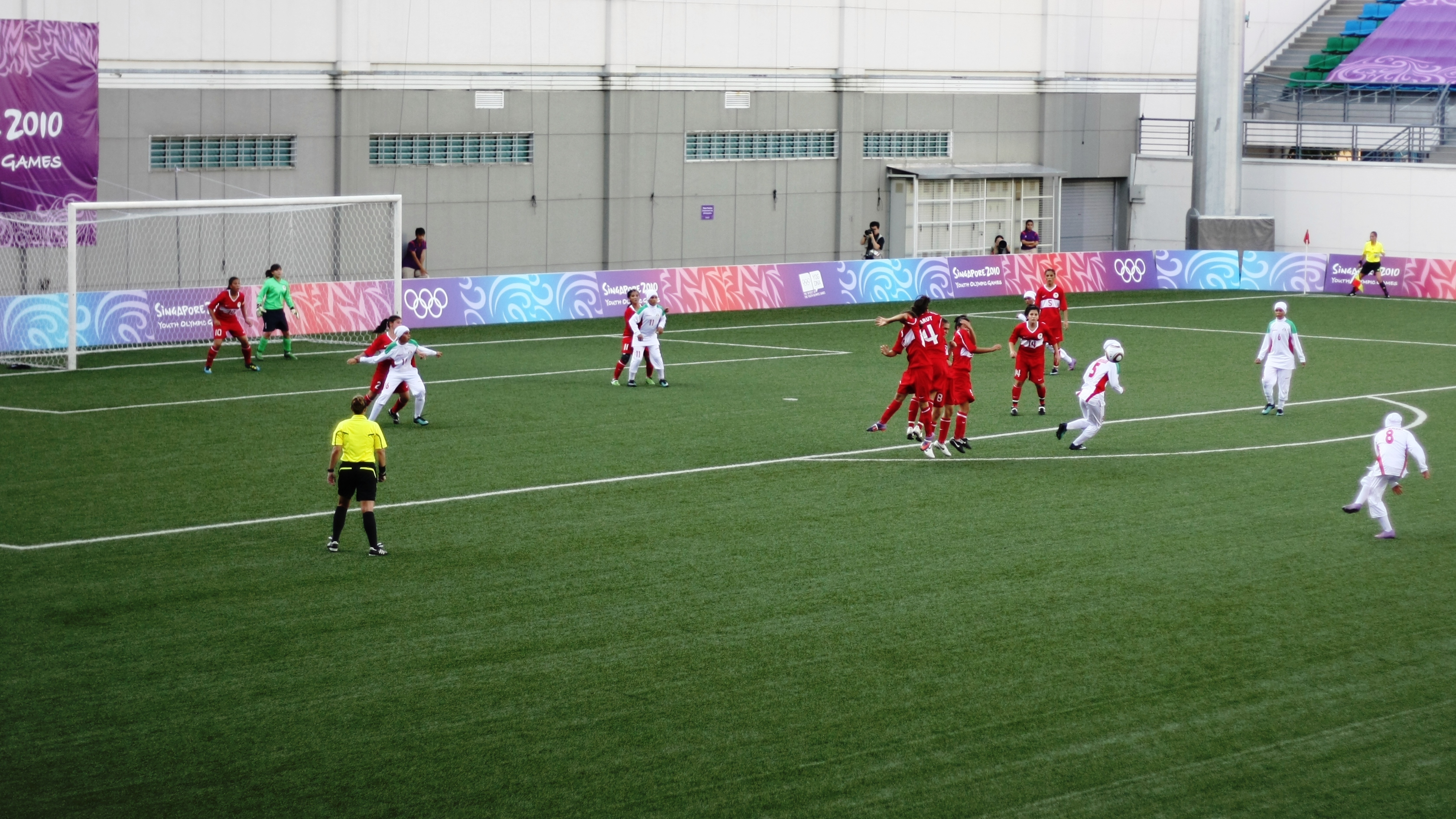
Girls' tournament between Iran & Turkey,

The football competition at the 2010 Summer Youth Olympics took place between 12–25 August. The draw was made on 18 May 2010. Players must be 15 years old (born between 1 January and 31 December 1995) to be eligible to participate. Playing time was made up of two periods of 40 minutes with a half-time break of 15 minutes.

== Teams ==
Continent	Boys'	Girls'
Africa (CAF)	Zimbabwe	Equatorial Guinea
Asia (AFC)	Singapore	Iran
Europe (UEFA)	Montenegro	Turkey
North America (CONCACAF)	Haiti	Trinidad and Tobago
Oceania (OFC)	Vanuatu	Papua New Guinea
South America (CONMEBOL)	Bolivia	Chile

== Medal summary ==
Event	Gold	Silver	Bronze
Boys'	Bolivia	Haiti	Singapore
Girls'	Chile	Equatorial Guinea	Turkey

== Participating teams ==
=== Boys ===
Group A

- Bolivia
- Haiti
- Vanuatu

Group B

- Montenegro
- Singapore
- Zimbabwe

=== Girls ===
Group A

- Iran
- Papua New Guinea
- Turkey

Group B

- Chile
- Equatorial Guinea
- Trinidad and Tobago
