= Equatorial Guinea at the 2018 Summer Youth Olympics =

- IOC code: GEQ
- NOC: Comité Olímpico de Guinea Ecuatorial

in Buenos Aires, Argentina 6 – 18 October 2018
- Competitors: 3 in 2 sports
- Flag bearer: Érica Mouwangui
- Medals: Gold 0 Silver 0 Bronze 0 Total 0

Summer Youth Olympics appearances
- 2010; 2014; 2018

Equatorial Guinea participated at the 2018 Summer Youth Olympics in Buenos Aires, Argentina from 6 October to 18 October 2018.

== Athletics (track and field) ==
Track & road events

Athlete	Event	Stage 1		Stage 2		Final placing	
Athlete	Event	Result	Rank	Result	Rank	Result	Rank
Érica Mouwangui	Girls' 100 m	13.76	30	13.21	29	26.97	29

== Swimming ==
Boys

Athlete	Event	Heat		Semifinal		Final	
Athlete	Event	Time	Rank	Time	Rank	Time	Rank
Andrés Akue	50 m freestyle	32.61	52	did not advance			
Andrés Akue	50 m breaststroke	44.81	34	did not advance			

Girls

Athlete	Event	Heat		Semifinal		Final	
Athlete	Event	Time	Rank	Time	Rank	Time	Rank
Rita Ekomba	50 m breaststroke	49.28	40	did not advance			
Rita Ekomba	50 m freestyle	42.22	52	did not advance			
