= NUSSU Rag and Flag =

Singaporean annual charity project

NUSSU Rag and Flag is an annual charity project featured prominently in the National University of Singapore Students' Union (NUSSU) Freshmen Orientation Programme. The project comprises two separate but related events: students taking to the streets asking the public for donations on Flag Day and, subsequently, a procession of thematic floats that will perform within the university grounds on Rag Day.

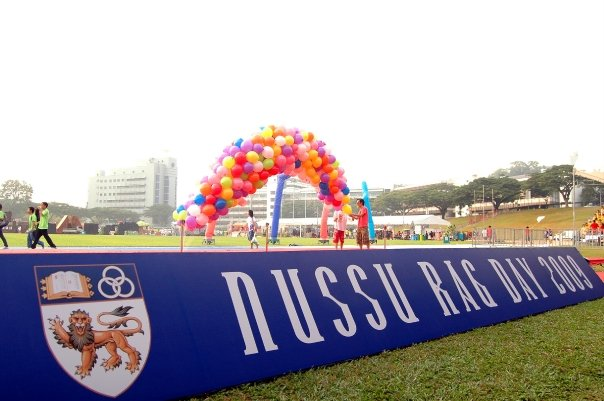
Image from Rag and Flag day 2009.

== History ==
=== Background ===
Started in 1958/9 by the University of Malaya Students’ Union (later University of Singapore Students’ Union, and now, the National University of Singapore Students' Union), the early Rag and Flag Days were enthusiastic highlights of NUS students' collective effort to help the community through creativity and imagination. The format changed, splitting the project into two separate events in the 1980s. Nevertheless, Rag Day remains a day when all the NUS Halls of Residence and Faculty Clubs vie for the top spot to construct the best float complemented by outstanding performances to impress the judges. Since the 1980s, Rag Day has been confined to the campus grounds at Kent Ridge. In 2007, the Rag procession once again made its appearance in the city to show appreciation to the public for their donations. Funds that are raised on Flag Day, via methods of charity car washes, record breaking feats, charity bazaars and cultural performances among many others, were distributed to various charitable organisations. The tradition of Rag and Flag Day has continued to this day and is the highlight of the National University of Singapore's academic calendar.

=== Inception ===
In 1957, during tensions between the Malayan Communist Party (MCP) and the British Regime, Emergency was the order of the day in Singapore. An ongoing secret revolution amongst workers unions and Chinese medium schools reached into the hearts of students at Bukit Timah Campus where then University of Malaya resided. It was during this time that 9th Student Union Elections were being held and the new Executive Committee was being selected. During the election rallies, then-Presidential-nominee, Frederick Samuel, spoke fervently of the challenges facing the country and the need for the student body to do something positive for the disadvantaged in society. Under pressure by the student body to deliver on his promise when he was eventually elected, Frederick and his team brainstormed ideas for a meaningful project that can bring all students together for a common charitable cause.

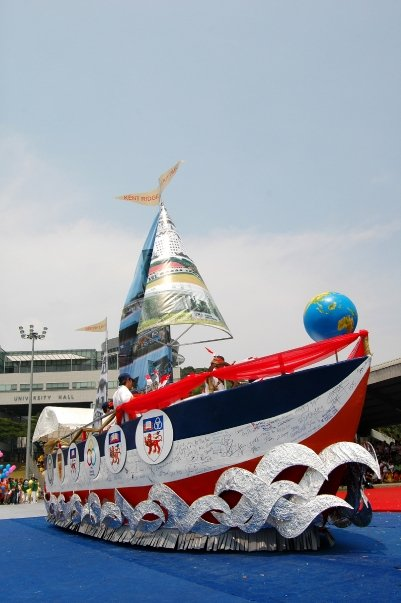
A Float from Rag and Flag 2009.

The Executive committee finally settled on the plan to organise the First Students Welfare Week scheduled for November 1957. The Patron for this welfare week was then Prime Minister of the Federation of Malaya, Tunku Abdur Rahman. The Welfare week provided a forum on University Student's role in society, a blood donation campaign, a mega concert, a Flag Day and a procession of Floats through the city. Proceeds from Flag Day went to the Singapore Association for the Deaf and Dumb, the Marymount Vocational School for Girls and the Johor State Welfare Committee's Project for Crippled Children. This evolved into what is the NUSSU Rag and Flag today.

== Amounts made over the years ==
FY	Amount raised	Event	Award (from NCSS)
FY12/13	More than $415,700	NUSSU Rag & Flag Day 2013	
FY11/12	More than $460,000	NUSSU Rag & Flag Day 2012	
FY10/11	More than $480,000	NUSSU Rag & Flag Day 2011	Special Events Platinum Award
FY09/10	More than $510,000	NUSSU Rag & Flag Day 2010	
FY09/10	$443,375.35	NUSSU Rag & Flag Day 2009	
FY08/09	$505,535.78	NUSSU Rag & Flag Day 2008	Special Events Platinum Award
FY07/08	$444,439.07	NUSSU Rag & Flag Day 2007	Special Events Platinum Award
FY06/07	$282,600.72	NUSSU Rag & Flag Day 2006	5-Year Outstanding Special Events Award, Special Events Gold Award
FY05/06	$210,297.00	NUSSU Rag & Flag Day 2005	Special Events Gold Award
FY04/05	$241,670.49	NUS Projects	Special Events Gold Award
FY03/04	$334,800.00	NUSSU Rag & Flag Day	Special Events Platinum Award
FY02/03	$254,660.68	NUSSU Rag & Flag Day	Special Events Gold Award

== Criticism ==
Principal criticisms of Rag and Flag surround the exorbitant expenditures on rag floats, environmentally damaging practices and unhealthy rivalry, weighed against the University's belief that the event nonetheless promotes Faculty bonding and the strengthening of varsity identity through tradition.

In August 2011, NUSSU Rag and Flag, though Rag in particular, came under scrutiny in the form of a student-made documentary, "Rag to Riches" that critically examines this NUS tradition.

Questioning links between Rag's original purpose as a community project to celebrate the generosity of Flag donations and its current form as an intensive intra-varsity competition, the documentary suggests a strong disconnect between these two aspects. Pointing out the environmentally unfriendly practices of various Rag teams, the documentary also points out flaws in Rag's apparent pro-Environment stance.

A Straits Times article dated 14 August also raised the issue of the high costs of producing Rag floats, with reports of figures between $6,000–$30,000 spent on individual floats, the higher figure once going towards the installation of a hydraulics system. NUSSU representatives admitted that while caps on spending are put into place, over-spending on floats is largely ungovernable. With reports of intense, often aggressive rivalries, and wastage of resources (how, for example, students reportedly emptied soft drink cans instead of collecting used ones), the article questioned if Rag had become derailed, regressing from its function as a Freshman event to an unhealthy competition.
