= 1988 Summer Olympics torch relay =

- Host city: Seoul, South Korea
- Countries visited: Greece, Thailand, South Korea
- Distance: 4,526 kilometres (2,812 mi)
- Torchbearers: 1,856
- Start date: August 23, 1988
- End date: September 17, 1988
- Torch designer: Lee Woo-Sung
- No. of torches: 3,300

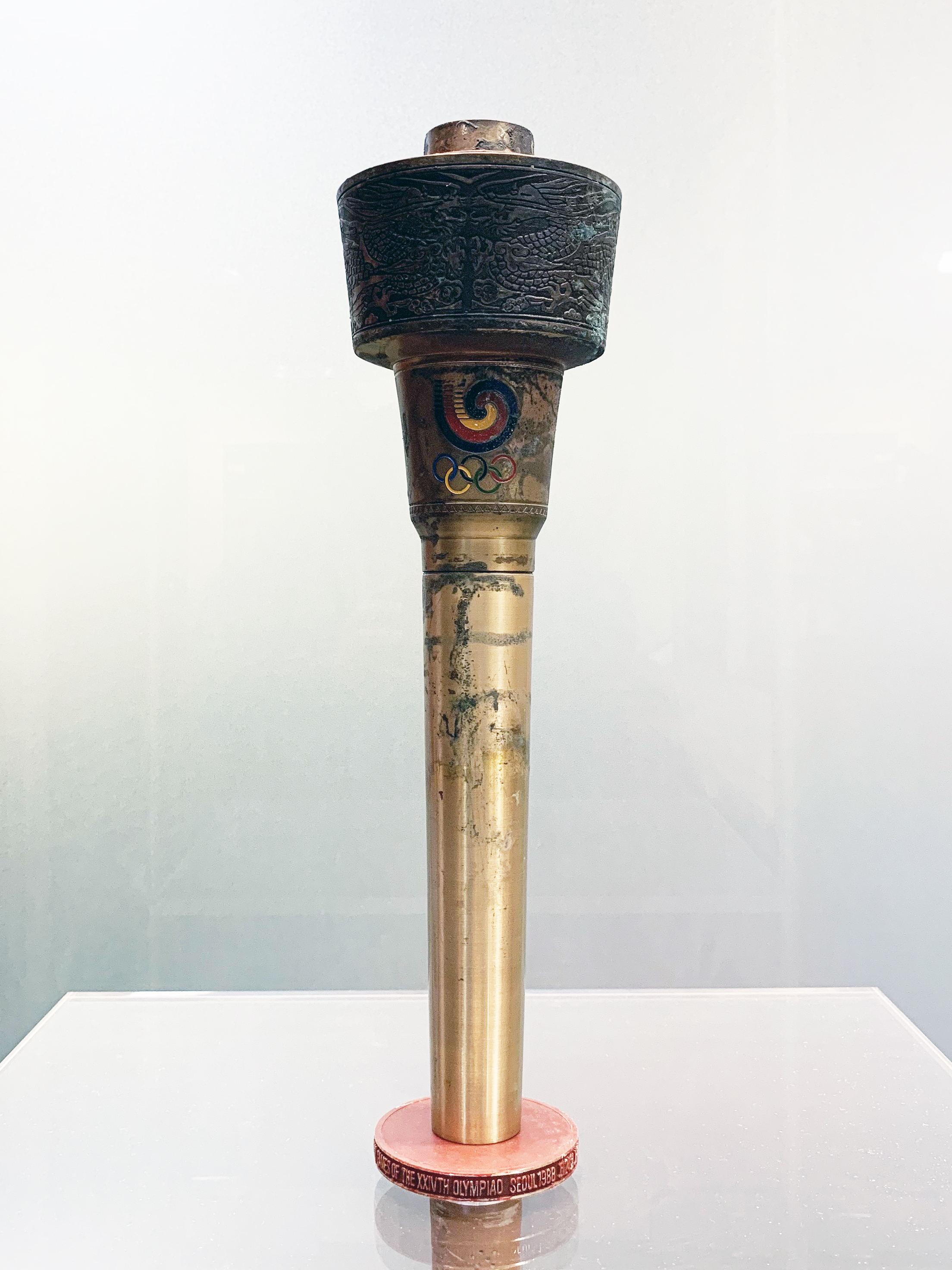
A torch from the relay

The 1988 Summer Olympics torch relay was run from August 23 until September 17, prior to the 1988 Summer Olympics in Seoul. The route covered around 4,526 kilometres (2,812 mi) and involved over 1,856 torchbearers. Sohn Kee-chung, Chung Sun-man and Kim Won-tak lit the cauldron at the opening ceremony.

== Route in South Korea ==
- August 27 (day 1): Shinsan Park
- August 28 (day 2): Busan
- August 29 (day 3): Jinju
- August 30 (day 4): Suncheon
- August 31 (day 5): Mokpo
- September 1 (day 6): Gwangju
- September 2 (day 7): Daegu
- September 3 (day 8): Pohang
- September 4 (day 9): Gumi
- September 5 (day 10): Daejeon
- September 6 (day 11): Jeonju
- September 7 (day 12): Gongju
- September 8 (day 13): Cheongju
- September 9 (day 14): Chungju
- September 10 (day 15): Gangneung
- September 11 (day 16): Chuncheon
- September 12 (day 17): Wonju
- September 13 (day 18): Suwon
- September 14 (day 19): Incheon
- September 15 (day 20): Uijeongbu
Route in Seoul
- September 16 (day 21): Seoul City Hall
- September 17 (day 22): Olympic Stadium
Route in Busan
- September 19 (day 24): Yongdusan Park
- September 19 (day 24): Busan Yachting Center
