= *SCAPE building =

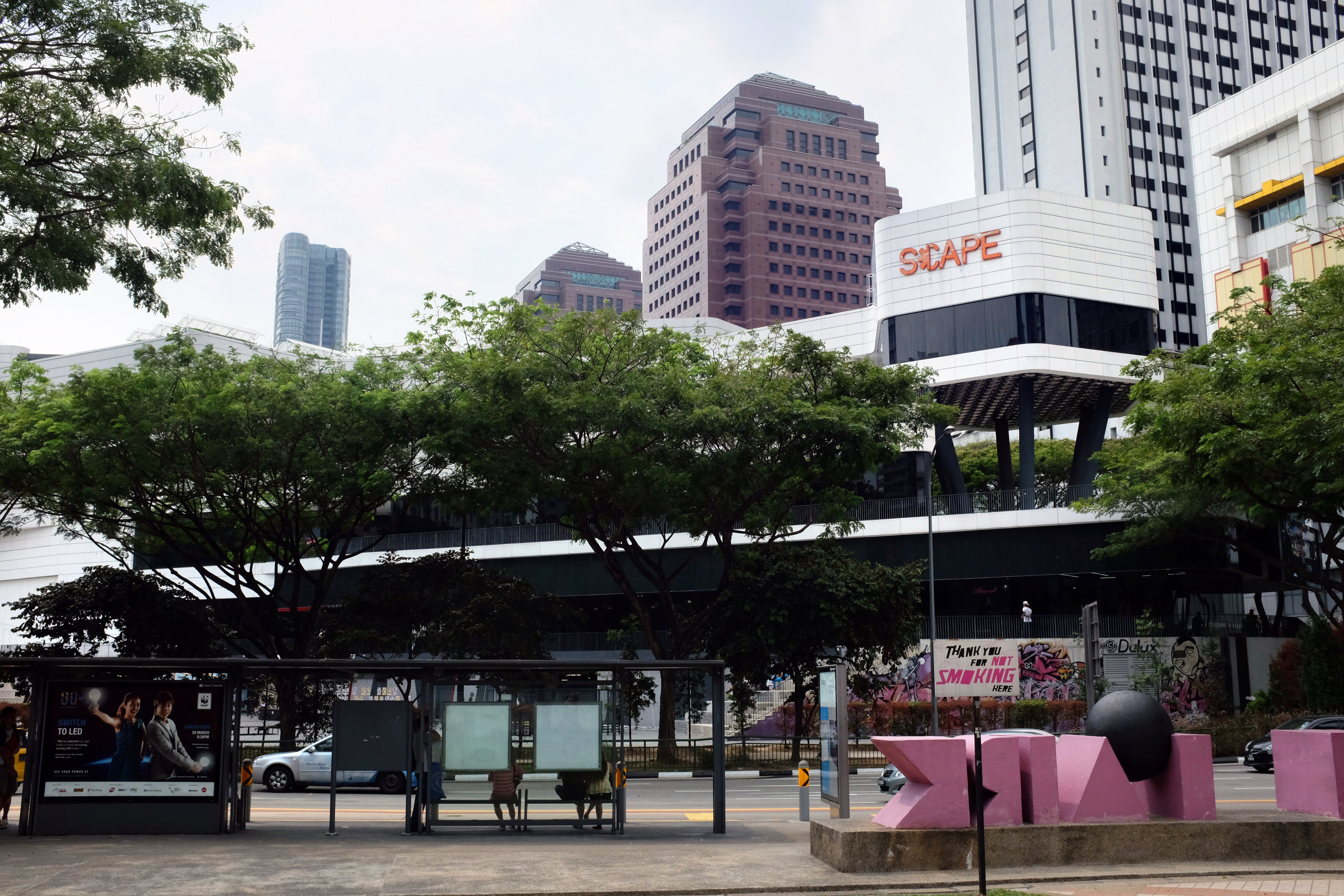
- *SCAPE building along Orchard Link

General information
- Location: 2 Orchard Link, Singapore 237978
- Coordinates: 1.3010088°N 103.8357274°E
- Owner: *SCAPE Co Ltd

Design and construction
- Architecture firm: RSP Architects Planners & Engineers

Website
- www.scape.sg

The *SCAPE building is a community youth space located at 2 Orchard Link in Orchard Road, Singapore. Completed in 2010, the five-storey building spans 13,103.13 square metres (3.2 acres) and was designed by RSP Architects. The structure has a hexagon-clad façade, open circulation spaces, and multiple entrances.

In response to calls for a youth community space, a consultation exercise was held in 2005, and two thousand suggestions were gathered from the youths. An advisory panel consolidated these suggestions into six conceptual spaces themed around street culture, music, and technology. RSP Architects' proposal was selected through a 2006 architectural design competition, as it was integrated with the surroundings and emphasised youth-centric spaces.

Since its opening in June 2010, *SCAPE has undergone multiple revamps to boost youth engagement. A 2012 revamp introduced HubQuarters as a base for youth organisations offering development programmes, while a 2014 renovation added performance areas and a media hub. Another major redevelopment was announced in 2022 as part of the Somerset Belt Masterplan, which aimed to revitalise the district with new infrastructure, an updated tenant mix, and enhanced accessibility. The Ground Theatre and HubQuarters reopened in 2024, with further upgrades scheduled to be completed by the end of 2025. The hub officially reopened on 9 November 2025.

== Site ==
*SCAPE is located at 2 Orchard Link, south of Hilton Singapore Orchard and Cathay Cineleisure Orchard. The Youth Park lies southeast of the building and is close to Somerset MRT station. The development is part of the "Somerset Belt", which was envisioned by the Singapore Ministry of Culture, Community and Youth (MCCY) as a dynamic space "shaped for youth and eventually by youth" to foster youth participation, identity, and aspirations. The five-storey building, with an area of 13,103.13 square metres (3.2 acres), occupies a site that was previously a carpark.

According to the Ministry of Community Development, Youth and Sports (MCYS, the predecessor of MCCY), the asterisk in *SCAPE represents a "wildcard". The asterisk signifies the various functions and activities that can be held at the venue, such as a "soundscape" for music, "mindscape" for learning new skills, and "playscape" for recreational activities. A *SCAPE spokesperson added that the name also represents both a "physical platform" for the youths to develop and showcase their talents and a "mental space" filled with "creativity and possibilities".

== Architecture ==
Designed by RSP Architects Planners and Engineers, the building was chosen through a 2006 competition organised by MCYS and received public endorsement through a vote. It features distinctive hexagonal cladding, along "versatile spaces" and "open circulation" that, according to RSP, embody "youthful vibrancy". The design prioritises accessibility of public space with a "porous" layout of several entry and exit points. The existing tree canopy was preserved, serving as a natural sunlight filter. A curved reflective ceiling overhangs the main drop-off area and the third-storey terrace.

On the ground floor facing Grange Road is the "Playspace", an outdoor event area that can accommodate 4,000 people standing. This site was left undeveloped because an MRT line runs beneath it. Initially, the building design featured six conceptual spaces, consolidated from 2,200 suggestions gathered during the 2005 consultation exercise. These spaces were to be connected via "interaction spaces", transitory spaces that would have allowed various impromptu activities to be held. Following the 2022 revamp, these spaces were restructured into three zones: the "Sense and Sustainability" for youth entrepreneurs to share ideas, "Freedom for Expression" for creative self-expression, and "My Creative Haven" as a digital and physical hub for learning and collaboration.

On the first floor is the Underground (formerly Street + Market), a bazaar space that accommodates around 30 flea market stalls and can also function as an acoustic performance venue. The second storey houses the Ground Theatre, a 10,362 ft^{2} (962.7 m^{2}) space with seating for over 450 guests. Retail outlets and eateries span the second and third floors. The Studio, located across the third and fourth levels, contains jamming and dance facilities. There are sky terraces on the top three storeys, which function as relaxation spaces where youth could socialise. The HubQuarters and the management office are located on the fourth floor, while other offices occupy the fifth floor.

== History ==
=== Construction ===
*SCAPE was established in 2004 by MCYS as a non-profit organisation that would engage youth and allow them to explore their social interests and creative pursuits. In response to requests for a youth community space, minister Vivian Balakrishnan announced in March 2005 that a 1.2 ha (3.0-acre) site adjacent to Orchard Cineleisure and Mandarin Hotel would be reserved for that purpose. A youth consultation was hosted in July and August, during which more than 2,000 suggestions were collected through surveys, focus group meetings, e-mail and SMS messages. A 22-member advisory panel, led by architect Khairudin Saharom and PromiseWorks youth volunteer Charissa Ee, reviewed the suggestions. Some of the suggestions included substituting the building's escalators for slides, and an outdoor skating rink with a special polymer surface instead of ice.

In March 2006, Balakrishnan announced that the planned site would be expanded to 2 ha (4.9 acres) to provide more space for youth engagement and self-expression. The advisory panel consolidated the 2,200 suggestions into six conceptual spaces: the Street+Market (promoting street culture), the Warehouse (a sheltered space), the Playground (an outdoor space which would include a skatepark), the Grid (IT and gaming labs), the Cache (a gallery and screening room) and the Studio (for music creation). An architectural design competition for *SCAPE garnered 39 entries, seven of which were shortlisted for the youths to vote on that December. The final design by RSP Architects was selected by a panel of seven judges and was among the youths' three favourites. The judges preferred its organic layout, which integrated seamlessly with the surroundings, and they believed the proposal best positioned *SCAPE as "an iconic space for youths" rather than just "an iconic building". RSP's design included nine additional features, such as a music zone with overhead pods playing the latest hit songs and offering free music downloads, as well as a "night owl hangout" equipped with telescopes for stargazing.

In September 2009, it was announced that the building would open in March 2010. Only 30% of the space was allocated to retail or food-and-beverage concessions, while the remainder was dedicated to facilities designed to nurture youth talent and foster a vibrant youth community. During its search tenants, *SCAPE stated that it would prioritise businesses with a social mission that engages with young people. In February 2010, Today reported that the building's completion date had been postponed to June. By that time, approximately 80% of the retail space had been leased. On 7 May 2010, prime minister Lee Hsien Loong launched the 99-Day Celebration to the Singapore 2010 Youth Olympic Games at *SCAPE Youth Space.

The *SCAPE building officially opened on 19 June 2010. That October, The Straits Times reported that the youth mall struggled to attract foot traffic and retain its tenants since its opening. Some tenants, including a hair salon and a drinks and rice burgers outlet, shared that they were experiencing significant financial losses and had requested rent reductions. Although numerous events had been held at the venue, they had largely failed to bring visitors into the mall's stores, prompting *SCAPE's management to collaborate with tenants to attract customers. Many retailers, such as Animal and New Balance, had turned to offering discounts to sustain their businesses. In December 2011, *SCAPE announced a new entrepreneurship programme with part of the space reserved for youth-run businesses, but retailers expressed unhappiness with the low patronage, saying that the venue had failed to attract youths.

=== Subsequent revamps ===
The venue underwent a S$500,000 renovation in 2012 to enhance youth engagement. The first-floor space, formerly known as "Street+Market", was renovated and rebranded as "Underground", a hub for young entrepreneurs. A new 850 sq ft (79 m^{2}) "HubQuarters" was established on the fourth and fifth floors, replacing the former "Cache" space and serving as a base for youth organisations offering development programmes. The changes were aimed to provide more structured initiatives while preserving an inclusive space for youth activities. Additionally, *SCAPE partnered with Nanyang Polytechnic, ITE College East, and Lasalle College of the Arts to support and mentor aspiring entrepreneurs.

Another revamp was announced by youth minister Lawrence Wong in May 2014. By that time, the venue was attracting 440,000 visitors per month. The S$2.5 million project introduced new facilities, including a 100-seater indoor gallery, an outdoor stage with seating areas, and a dedicated walkway for street performances and wall art. A new media hub was also established for media groups to hotdesk or host events, with organisations like the Singapore Film Society and Project Unsung Heroes utilising the space. Nevertheless, Delane Lim of Agape Group Holdings noted that the space still lacked a clear identity because it tried to be a hub for retail, entrepreneurship, arts, media, and community service. Conversely, he said youth hubs in Hong Kong and South Africa thrive by being commercially run by young entrepreneurs, allowing for fresh ideas and greater autonomy with government funding. In June 2018, HubQuarters was revamped into a co-working space for youths.

On 27 July 2022, *SCAPE announced that the building would undergo another revamp to attract youths of all ages. The revitalisation was part of the Somerset Belt Masterplan, which aimed to "revitalise" the district into a "dynamic" hub for youths. The venue would be restructured into three major zones to allow further collaborations between young entrepreneurs, creatives, and content creators. Besides infrastructure changes to enhance the building's accessibility, a new tenant mix of retail, leisure and entertainment would be introduced. The project was expected to begin in early 2023 and completed in early 2024. By June 2024, limited venues were available to the public, with the planned "refreshed line-up" of tenants was planned to be confirmed only in 2025. In February 2025, the MCCY announced that the remaining upgrading works would be completed by the end of that year. *SCAPE officially reopened on 9 November 2025.
