= Emiliana Nchama =

Equatoguinean footballer (born 1986)

Personal information
- Full name: Emiliana Nchama Ndong Angono
- Date of birth: 24 October 1986 (age 40)
- Place of birth: Akurenam, Equatorial Guinea
- Height: 1.64 m (5 ft 5 in)
- Position: Goalkeeper

Senior career*
Years	Team	Apps	(Gls)
- Deportivo Evinayong
- Malabo Kings

International career^{‡}
2012–2022	Equatorial Guinea	8	(0)
Medal record
Women's football
Representing Equatorial Guinea
Women's Africa Cup of Nations
First place	2012 Equatorial Guinea
- * Club domestic league appearances and goals ‡ National team caps and goals as of 23 February 2022

Emiliana Nchama Ndong Angono (born 24 October 1986) is an Equatorial Guinean footballer who plays as a goalkeeper. She capped for the Equatorial Guinea women's national team.

== International career ==
Nchama competed for Equatorial Guinea at the 2018 Africa Women Cup of Nations, playing in two matches.
