= Equatorial Guinea at the 2014 Summer Youth Olympics =

- IOC code: GEQ
- NOC: Comité National Olympique Equato-Guinéen

in Nanjing
- Competitors: 2 in 2 sports
- Medals: Gold 0 Silver 0 Bronze 0 Total 0

Summer Youth Olympics appearances
- 2010; 2014; 2018

Equatorial Guinea competed at the 2014 Summer Youth Olympics, in Nanjing, China from 16 August to 28 August 2014.

== Athletics ==
Equatorial Guinea qualified one athlete.

Qualification Legend: Q=Final A (medal); qB=Final B (non-medal); qC=Final C (non-medal); qD=Final D (non-medal); qE=Final E (non-medal)

Girls
Track & road events

Athlete	Event	Heats		Final	
Athlete	Event	Result	Rank	Result	Rank
Maria Nzobeya Nzang	100 m	13.97	26 qD	DSQ	

== Taekwondo ==
Equatorial Guinea was given a wild card to compete.

Boys

Athlete	Event	Round of 16	Quarterfinals	Semifinals	Final	Rank
Athlete	Event	Opposition Result	Opposition Result	Opposition Result	Opposition Result	Rank
Jose Nguema Larangeira	−55 kg	J Tortosa (ESP); L DSQ	did not advance			9
