= Javiera Roa =

Chilean footballer (born 1995)

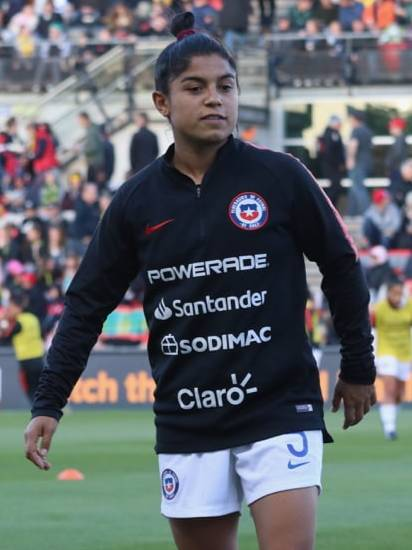
- Roa with Chile in 2019

Personal information
- Full name: Javiera Catalina Roa Silva
- Date of birth: 27 February 1995 (age 31)
- Height: 1.57 m (5 ft 2 in)
- Position: Forward

Team information
- Current team: Municipal

Senior career*
Years	Team	Apps	(Gls)
- Colo-Colo
- Universidad de Chile
2019–2022	Santiago Morning		
2023	Municipal		
2024	Santiago Morning		
2024–	Municipal		

International career^{‡}
2010	Chile U15	4	(0)
2019–	Chile	5	(0)
Medal record
Women's football
Representing Chile
Youth Olympic Games
Gold medal – first place	2010 Singapore	Team
- * Club domestic league appearances and goals ‡ National team caps and goals as of 10 July 2023

Javiera Catalina Roa Silva (born 27 February 1995) is a Chilean footballer who plays as a forward for Guatemalan club Municipal and the Chile women's national team.

== Club career ==
In 2019, she signed her professional contract with Santiago Morning.

In 2023, she moved abroad and signed with Guatemalan club Municipal Femenil. The next year, she rejoined Santiago Morning. In the second half of 2024, she returned to Municipal.

== International career ==
Roa made her senior debut for Chile on 29 August 2019 in a 1–0 friendly win against Costa Rica.

== Honours ==
Chile U15

- Summer Youth Olympics Gold medal: 2010
