= Christelle Nyepel =

Cameroonian footballer

Personal information
- Full name: Olive Christelle Ngo Nyepel
- Date of birth: 16 January 1995 (age 31)
- Place of birth: Douala, Cameroon
- Height: 1.68 m (5 ft 6 in)
- Position: Midfielder

Senior career*
Years	Team	Apps	(Gls)
- Estrellas de E'Waiso Ipola

International career^{‡}
	Equatorial Guinea	7	(2)
- * Club domestic league appearances and goals ‡ National team caps and goals as of 26 June 2011 (before the 2011 FIFA Women's World Cup)

Olive Christelle Ngo Nyepel (born 16 January 1995), known as Christelle Nyepel, is a footballer who plays as a midfielder. Born and raised in Cameroon, she is a naturalized citizen of Equatorial Guinea and has played for that women's national team. She was part of the Equatorial Guinea squad at the 2011 FIFA Women's World Cup, making three appearances. At the club level she played for Estrellas de E'Waiso Ipola in Equatorial Guinea.
