= Hilal Başkol =

Turkish footballer (born 1995)

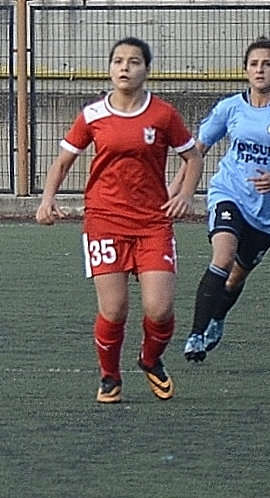
- Hilal Başkol playing for Konak Belediyespor in the 2013–14 season

Personal information
- Date of birth: 10 January 1995 (age 31)
- Place of birth: Amasya, Turkey
- Position: Attacking midfielder

Senior career*
Years	Team	Apps	(Gls)
2009–2011	Gölcükspor	39	(21)
2011–2013	Derince Belediyespor	27	(15)
2013–2017	Konak Belediyespor	45	(15)
Total		111	(51)

International career^{‡}
2009–2010	Turkey U-15	8	(4)
2010–2011	Turkey U-17	12	(2)
2012–2013	Turkey U-19	11	(4)
2014	Turkey U-21	1	(1)
2015	Turkey	1	(0)

Managerial career
- 2019–2020: Konak Belediyespor (assistant manager)
- 2022–: Galatasaray (assistant manager)
- * Club domestic league appearances and goals as of 4 June 2017 ‡ National team caps and goals as of 17 September 2015

Hilal Başkol (born 10 January 1995) is a Turkish women's footballer who plays as an attacking midfielder. She last played in the First League for Konak Belediyespor. She was a member of the Turkey women's national U-19 team in 2013.

== Early years ==
Hilal Başkol was born in Amasya, northern Turkey, on 10 January 1995. She grew up and was schooled in her hometown. In the school, she participated for some time in a basketball course, was though much more interested in football playing. Her teacher for physical education influenced her to join the newly formed girls' football team of the school. She enjoyed Turkish champion title with the school team.

She was called up to the qualifications for the Turkey girls' national under-15 football team, where she was spotted by the coach of Gölcükspor women's football team, who wanted to transfer her. Since there existed no league-playing women's football team in Amasya, she accepted, in agreement with her parents, to move to Gölcük, Kocaeli, although pretty far for a young girl.

== Playing career ==
Her position on the field is attacking midfielder.

=== Club ===
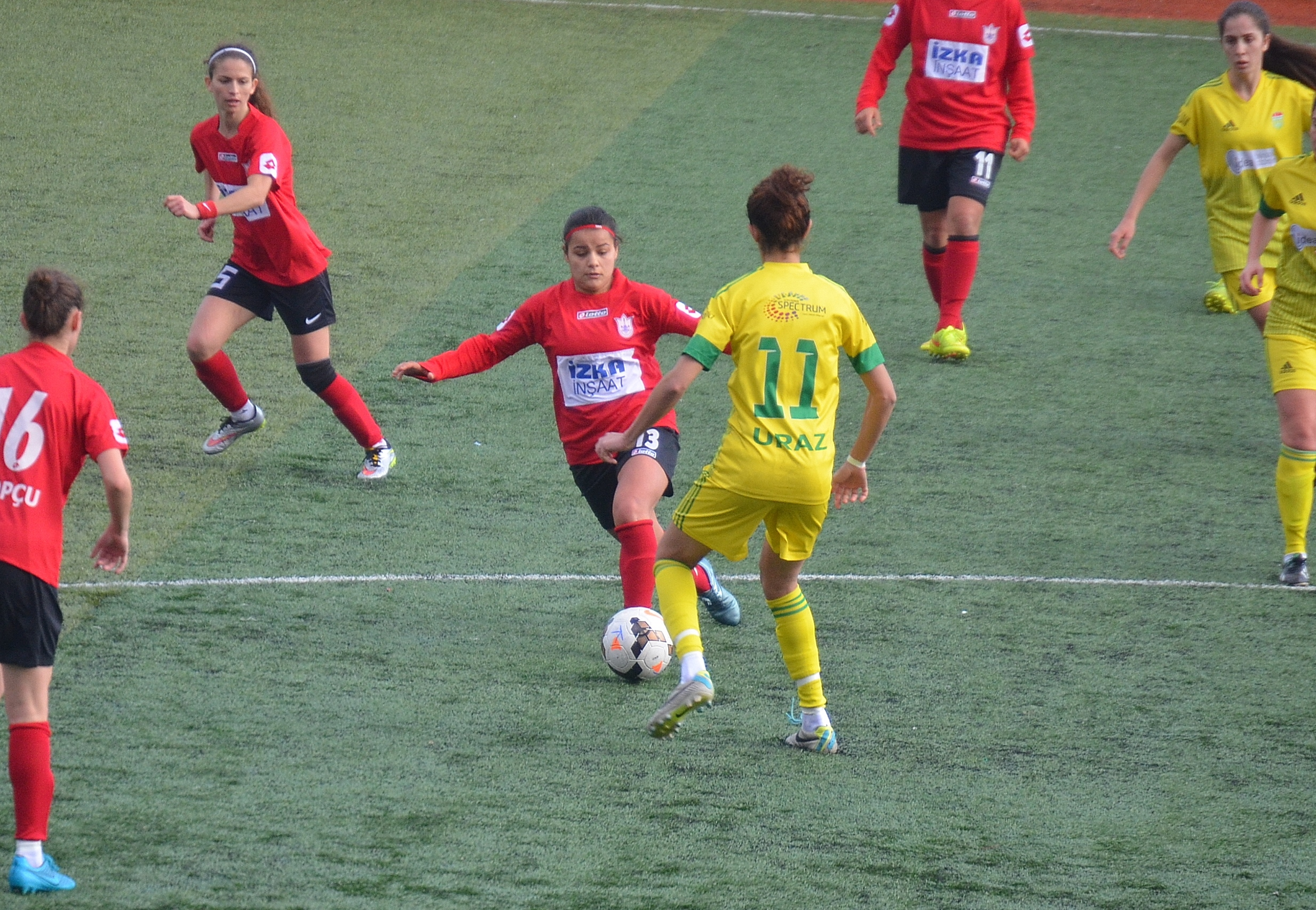
Hilal Başkol (red/black) driving the ball in the 2015–16 season's away match against Kireçburnu Spor

Hilal Başkol received her license on 22 October 2009 and began playing for Gölcükspor in the Women's Second League. After one season, her team was promoted to the Turkish Women's First League. Başkol played two seasons with Gölcükspor, capped 39 times and scored 21 goals. In the 2011–12 season, she transferred to Derince Belediyespor in the same province, however to play in the Second League again. At the end of the season, her team was promoted to the First League. There she was part two seasons, capping in 27 matches and netting 16 times.

In July 2013, she transferred from Derince Belediyespor, where she was known as the "super scorer", to Konak Belediyespor in İzmir.

She played at the 2015–16 UEFA Women's Champions League qualifying round matches and scored the only goal of her team in the match against FC Minsk. She scored her team's second goal at the 2015–16 UEFA Women's Champions League qualifying round match against Hibernians F.C. that ended 5–0 for Konak Belediyespor.

International goals
Date	Venue	Opponent	Competition	Result	Scored
Konak Beledyespor
11 August 2015	Stadion Otoka, Sarajevo, Bosnia and Herzegovina	(Belarus) FC Minsk	2015–16 UEFA Women's Champions League qualifying round	L 1–10	1
23 August 2016	Sportpark Vondersweijde, Oldenzaal, Netherlands	(Malta) Hibernians F.C.	2016–17 UEFA Women's Champions League qualifying round	W 5–0	1

=== International ===
Hilal Başkol became international playing for the Turkey girls' national U-15 team in the 2010 Summer Youth Olympics qualifying round match against Georgia on 12 October 2009, at which she scored also her first international goal. She took part then in the 2010 Summer Youth Olympics – Girls' tournament matches scoring three more goals for the Turkey U-15 team.

With the Turkey U-17 team, she participated at the 2012 UEFA Women's Under-17 Championship qualification#Group 7 matches, and scored her first goal for the U-17 team in the match against the Greek junior women on 1 October 2011. She has two goals in 8 games with the Turkey U-17 team.

She debuted for the Turkey U-19 team in the friendly match against Russia on 18 February 2012. Başkol took part at the 2014 UEFA Women's Under-19 Championship First qualifying round – Group 10 matches. She capped in total 11 times and scored 2 goals.

In 2014, she debuted in the Turkey women's U-21 team's friendly match against Belgium, and scored a goal.

She played her only once in the Turkey women's national team at the UEFA Women's Euro 2017 qualifying Group 5 match against Croatia in 2015.

== Career statistics ==
As of 4 June 2017.

Club	Season	League			Continental		National		Total	
Club	Season	Division	Apps	Goals	Apps	Goals	Apps	Goals	Apps	Goals
Gölcükspor	2009–10	Second League	18	14	–	–	5	1	23	15
Gölcükspor	2010–11	First League	21	7	–	–	12	5	33	12
Gölcükspor	Total		39	21	–	–	17	6	56	27
Derince Belediyespor	2011–12	Second League	11	11	–	–	5	0	16	11
Derince Belediyespor	2012–13	First League	16	4	–	–	2	0	18	4
Derince Belediyespor	Total		27	15	–	–	7	0	34	15
Konak Belediyespor	2013–14	First League	9	3	2	0	7	4	18	7
Konak Belediyespor	2014–15	First League	10	5	–	–	1	1	11	6
Konak Belediyespor	2015–16	First League	17	4	3	1	1	0	21	5
Konak Belediyespor	2016–17	First League	9	3	3	1	0	0	12	4
Konak Belediyespor	Total		45	15	8	2	9	5	62	22
Career total			111	51	8	2	33	11	152	64

== Honours ==
Turkish Women's First Football League

Konak Belediyespor
Winners (4): 2013–14, 2014–15, 2015–16, 2016–17
