= Grace Steven =

Papua New Guinean footballer

Personal information
- Date of birth: 19 February 1995 (age 31)
- Position: Forward

Senior career*
| Years | Team | Apps | (Gls) |
- Besta PNG United

International career^{‡}
| 2014 | Papua New Guinea | 1 | (0) |
- * Club domestic league appearances and goals ‡ National team caps and goals as of 29 October 2014

Grace Steven (born 19 February 1995) is a Papua New Guinean footballer who plays as a forward. She has been a member of the Papua New Guinea women's national team.
