= Sinforosa Eyang =

Equatoguinean football manager

Personal information
- Full name: Sinforosa Eyang Nguema Nchama
- Date of birth: 26 April 1994 (age 32)
- Height: 1.53 m (5 ft 0 in)
- Position: Midfielder

Team information
- Current team: Equatorial Guinea U20 Women (manager)

Senior career*
Years	Team	Apps	(Gls)
- Estrellas de E'Waiso Ipola
- Super Leonas

International career^{‡}
	Equatorial Guinea	17	(7)

Managerial career
- 2016–2022: Deportivo Evinayong (women)
- 2023–2024: Huracanes
- 2025–: Equatorial Guinea U20 Women
- * Club domestic league appearances and goals ‡ National team caps and goals as of 2011 (after the 2011 FIFA Women's World Cup)

Sinforosa Eyang Nguema Nchama (born 26 April 1994), also known as Mirey and La Mirey de Fifi, is an Equatoguinean singer, football manager, and former player who coaches the Equatorial Guinea women's national under-20 team.

Eyang was a midfielder during her playing career, which included being a vice-captain of the Equatorial Guinea women's national team, with which she played the 2011 FIFA Women's World Cup. On club level she played for Estrellas de E'Waiso Ipola and Super Leonas (which she captained) in her country.

== International goals ==
Scores and results list Equatorial Guinea's goal tally first

No.	Date	Venue	Opponent	Score	Result	Competition
1	17 June 2011	Stade Jos Becker, Niederanven, Luxembourg	Luxembourg	8–0	8–0	Friendly
