= Emiliana Mangue =

Equatoguinean footballer

Personal information
- Full name: Emiliana Mangue Mba Avomo
- Date of birth: 4 December 1991 (age 34)
- Place of birth: Equatorial Guinea
- Height: 1.65 m (5 ft 5 in)

Senior career*
| Years | Team | Apps | (Gls) |
- Estrellas de E'Waiso Ipola

International career
| 2011 | Equatorial Guinea | 0 | (0) |
- * Club domestic league appearances and goals

Emiliana Mangue Mba Avomo is an Equatoguinean footballer who played in the 2011 FIFA Women's World Cup.

== International career ==
In 2011, she joined at the last moment the Equatoguinean senior team for the 2011 FIFA Women's World Cup, replacing the sanctioned Jade.
