= List of 2010 Summer Youth Olympics medal winners =

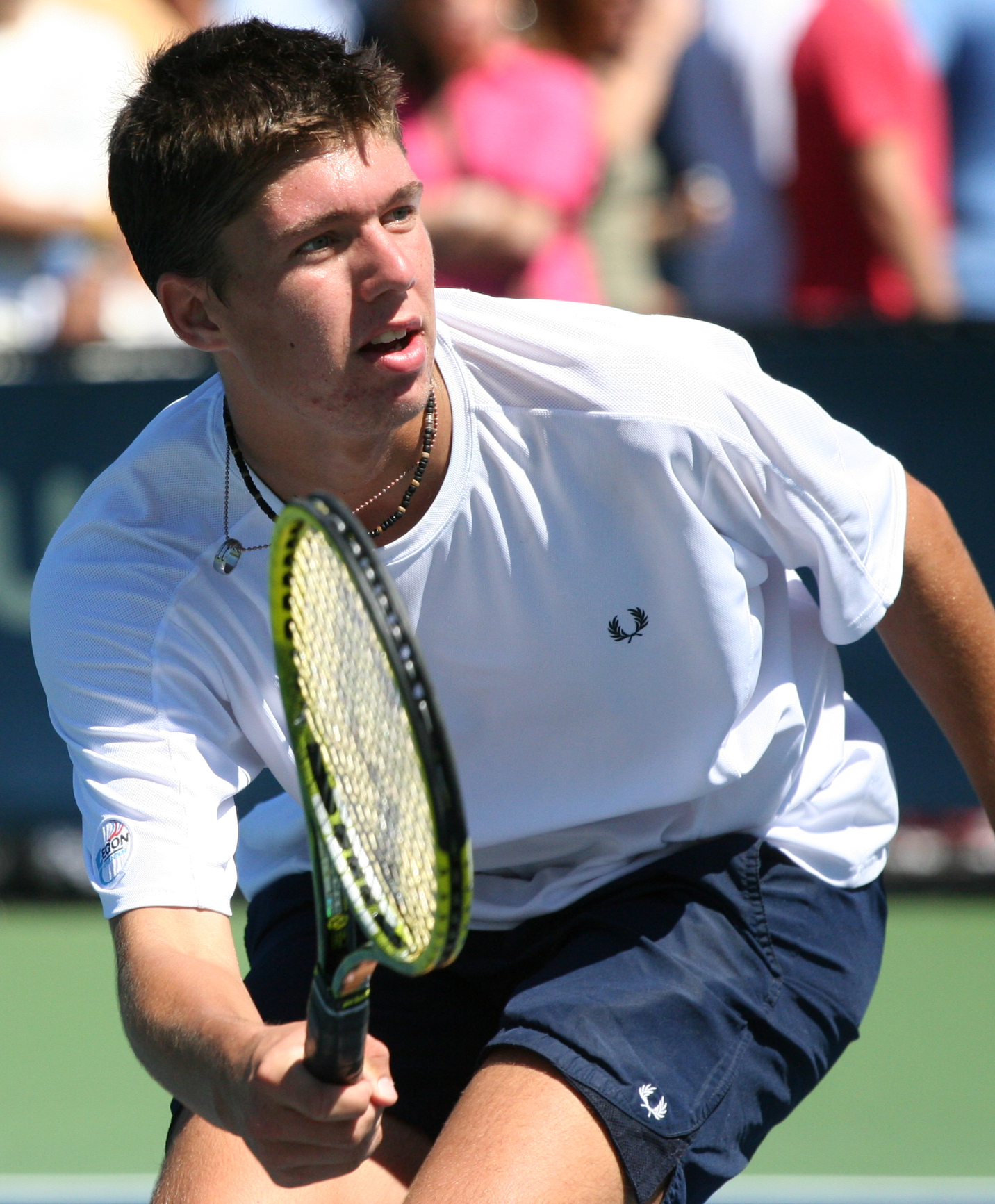
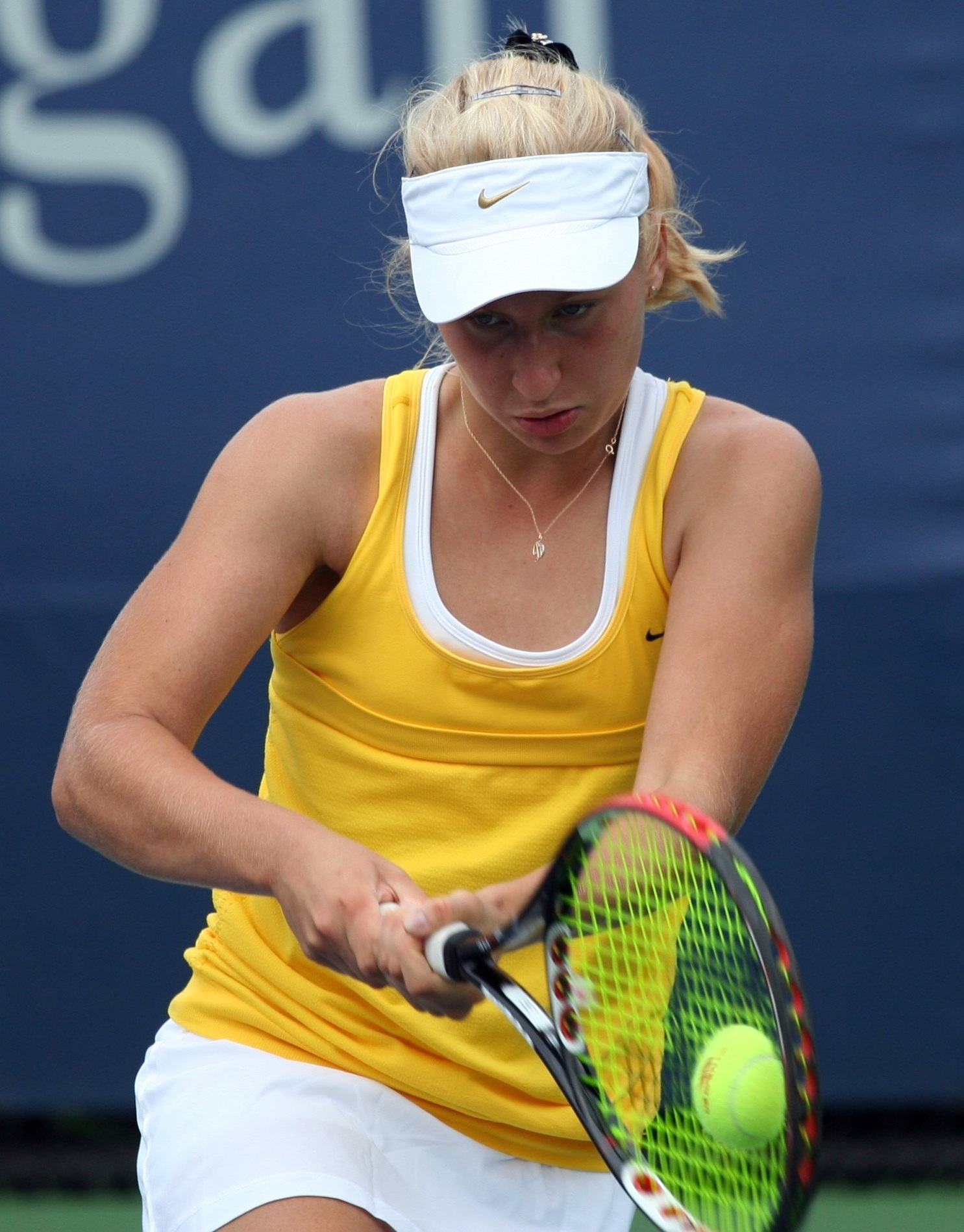
Oliver Golding (left) and Daria Gavrilova (right) won gold in the boys' doubles and girls' singles events respectively in tennis.

The 2010 Summer Youth Olympics, the inaugural event of its kind, were celebrated in Singapore from 14 to 26 August 2010. A total of 3,531 athletes between 14 and 18 years of age from 204 National Olympic Committees (NOCs) participated at the Games in 201 events in 26 sports.

A number of new events were held, including mixed-gender swimming relays, a single combined mixed-gender cycling event, and a number of mixed-NOCs team events. To foster friendship among participants, teams were formed by athletes from different countries to compete, often on an intercontinental basis. There were such events included in archery, athletics, equestrian, fencing, judo, modern pentathlon, table tennis, and triathlon, and a number of pairs in doubles tennis were formed by athletes from two different NOCs. In addition, some traditional events at the main Olympic Games were modified, most notably in basketball, which was contested according to FIBA 33 rules.

A total of 623 medals for events (202 gold, 200 silver and 221 bronze) were awarded; in judo and taekwondo two bronzes were awarded per event. Therefore, the total number of bronze medals is greater than the total number of gold or silver medals. Additionally there were ties for a gold medal and a bronze medal, both in swimming. On 15 October 2010 the IOC announced that an Uzbek silver medallist had failed a drugs test and had been disqualified, but no immediate decision was taken on whether to promote the next two athletes.

Athletes representing China won the most gold medals (not counting mixed-NOCs events) with 30, and also won the most medals overall with 51. Athletes from 98 countries won medals at the Games. The most decorated athlete at these Games was Tang Yi, who won six gold medals in swimming.

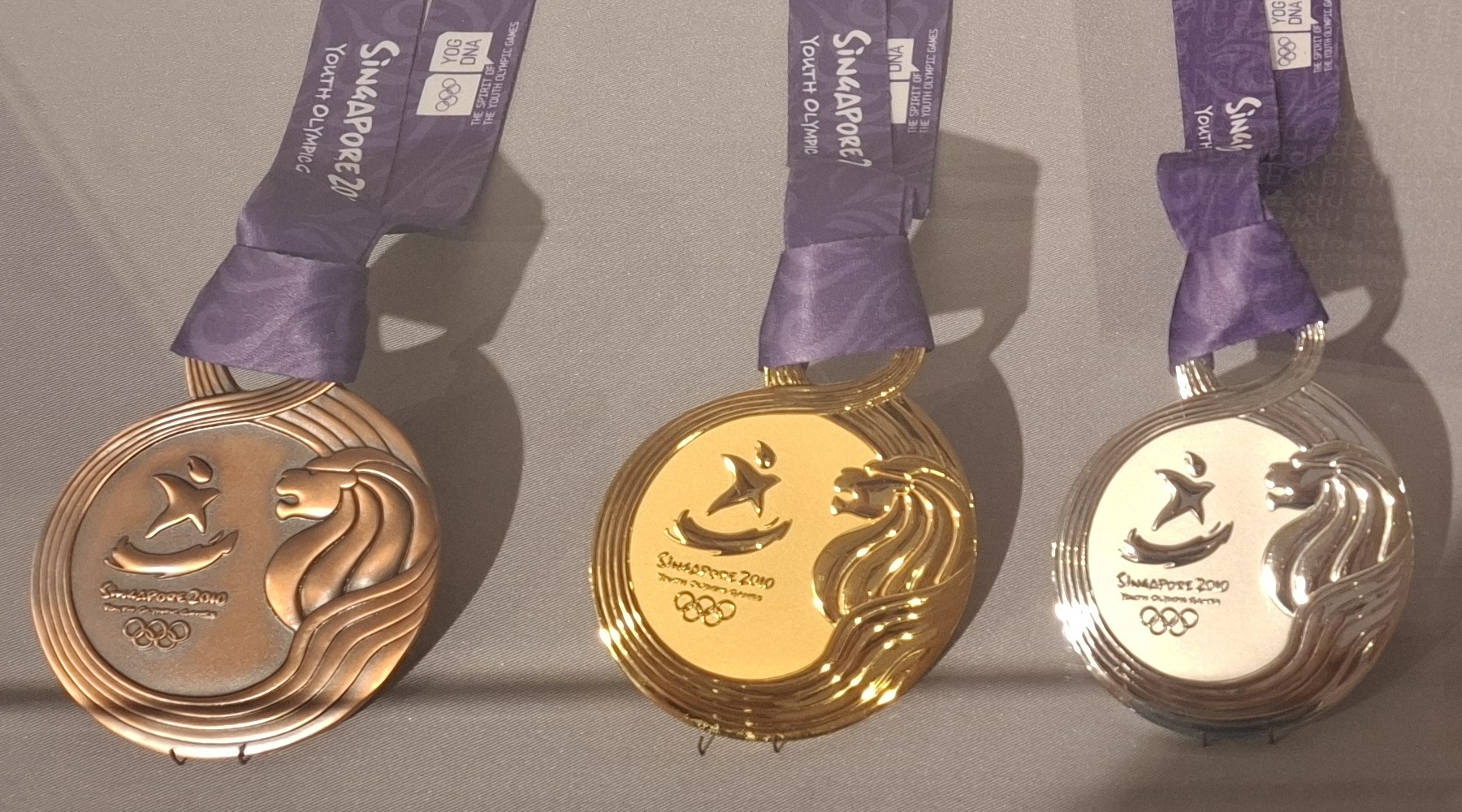
Medals of the 2010 Summer Youth Olympics

== Archery ==
Event	Gold	Silver	Bronze
Boys' individual	Ibrahim Sabry; Egypt	Rick van den Oever; Netherlands	Bolot Tsybzhitov; Russia
Girls' individual	Kwak Ye-Ji; South Korea	Tan Ya-Ting; Chinese Taipei	Tatiana Segina; Russia
Mixed team	Gloria Filippi; Italy; Anton Karoukin; Belarus	Zoi Paraskevopoulou; Greece; Gregor Rajh; Slovenia	Begunhan Unsal; Turkey; Abdul Dayyan Jaffar; Singapore

== Athletics ==
Event	Gold	Silver	Bronze
Boys' 100 m	Odean Skeen; Jamaica	Masaki Nashimoto; Japan	David Bolarinwa; Great Britain
Girls' 100 m	Josephine Omaka; Nigeria	Myasia Jacobs; United States	Fany Chalas; Dominican Republic
Boys' 200 m	Xie Zhenye; China	Keisuke Homma; Japan	Patrick Domogala; Germany
Girls' 200 m	Nkiruka Florence Nwakwe; Nigeria	Tynia Gaither; Bahamas	Olivia Ekpone; United States
Boys' 400 m	Luguelín Santos; Dominican Republic	Ruan Greyling; South Africa	Alphas Kishoyian; Kenya
Girls' 400 m	Robin Reynolds; United States	Bianca Răzor; Romania	Bukola Abogunloko; Nigeria
Boys' 1000 m	Mohammed Geleto; Ethiopia	Hamza Driouch; Qatar	Charlie Grice; Great Britain
Girls' 1000 m	Tizita Ashame; Ethiopia	Andrina Schlaepfer; Switzerland	Damaris Muthee; Kenya
Boys' 3000 m	Abrar Osman; Eritrea	Fekru Jebesa; Ethiopia	Hicham Sigueni; Morocco
Girls' 3000 m	Gladys Chesir; Kenya	Moe Kyuma; Japan	Samrawit Mengisteab; Eritrea
Boys' 110 m hurdles	Nicholas Hough; Australia	Wang Dongqiang; China	Jussi Kanervo; Finland
Girls' 100 m hurdles	Ekaterina Bleskina; Russia	Michelle Jenneke; Australia	Noemi Zbaeren; Switzerland
Boys' 400 m hurdles	Norge Lara Sotomayor; Cuba	Kumar Durgesh; India	William Mbevi Mutunga; Kenya
Girls' 400 m hurdles	Aurélie Chaboudez; France	Stina Troest; Denmark	Olena Kolesnychenko; Ukraine
Boys' 2000 m steeplechase	Peter Matheka Mutuku; Kenya	Habtamu Fayisa; Ethiopia	Zakaria Kiprotich; Uganda
Girls' 2000 m steeplechase	Virginia Nyambura; Kenya	Tsehynesh Tsenga; Ethiopia	Oksana Raita; Ukraine
Boys' medley relay	Americas; Caio Cézar dos Santos; Brazil; Odean Skeen; Jamaica; Najee Glass; United States; Luguelín Santos; Dominican Republic	Europe; David Bolarinwa; Great Britain; Tomasz Kluczynski; Poland; Marco Lorenzi; Italy; Nikita Uglov; Russia	Oceania; Lepani Naivalu; Fiji; John Rivan; Papua New Guinea; Nicholas Hough; Australia; Raheen Williams; Australia
Girls' medley relay	Americas; Myasia Jacobs; United States; Tynia Gaither; Bahamas; Rashan Brown; Bahamas; Robin Reynolds; United States	Africa; Josephine Omaka; Nigeria; Nkiruka Florence Nwakwe; Nigeria; Izelle Neuhoff; South Africa; Bukola Abogunloko; Nigeria	Europe; Annie Tagoe; Great Britain; Anna Bongiorni; Italy; Sonja Mosler; Germany; Bianca Răzor; Romania
Boys' 10 km walk	Igor Lyashchenko; Ukraine	Oscar Villavicencio; Ecuador	Pavel Parshin; Russia
Girls' 5 km walk	Anna Clemente; Italy	Mao Yanxue; China	Nadezda Leontyeva; Russia
Boys' high jump	Dmitry Kroytor; Israel	Brandon Starc; Australia	Viktor Chernysh; Ukraine
Girls' high jump	Maria Kuchina; Russia	Alessia Trost; Italy	Aneta Rydz; Poland
Boys' pole vault	Didac Salas; Spain	Thiago Braz da Silva; Brazil	Theodoros Chrysanthopoulos; Greece
Girls' pole vault	Angelica Bengtsson; Sweden	Elizabeth Parnov; Australia	Ganna Shelekh; Ukraine
Boys' long jump	Caio Cézar dos Santos; Brazil	Sho Matsubara; Japan	Rudolph Pienaar; South Africa
Girls' long jump	Lena Malkus; Germany	Alina Rotaru; Romania	Le'Tristan Pledger; United States
Boys' triple jump	Radame Fabar Sanchez; Cuba	Fu Haitao; China	Georgi Tsonov; Bulgaria
Girls' triple jump	Khadijatou Sagnia; Sweden	Sokhna Galle; France	Ganna Aleksandrova; Ukraine
Boys' shot put	Krzysztof Brzozowski; Poland	Jackson Gill; New Zealand	Dennis Lewke; Germany
Girls' shot put	Natalia Troneva; Russia	Gu Siyu; China	Anna Wloka; Poland
Boys' discus throw	Jacques Du Plessis; South Africa	Arjun; India	Jaromir Mazgal; Czech Republic
Girls' discus throw	Shanice Craft; Germany	Krisztina Váradi; Hungary	Heidi Schmidt; Sweden
Boys' hammer throw	Liu Binbin; China	Alexandros Poursanidis; Cyprus	Balazs Toreky; Hungary
Girls' hammer throw	Alexia Sedykh; France	Alena Navahrodskaya; Belarus	Xia Youlian; China
Boys' javelin throw	Braian Toledo; Argentina	Devin Bogert; United States	Intars Isejevs; Latvia
Girls' javelin throw	Kateryna Derun; Ukraine	Lismania Munoz Barcelay; Cuba	Hannah Carson; United States

== Badminton ==
Event	Gold	Silver	Bronze
Boys' singles	Pisit Poodchalat; Thailand	Prannoy Kumar; India	Kang Ji-wook; South Korea
Girls' singles	Sapsiree Taerattanachai; Thailand	Deng Xuan; China	Vu Thi Trang; Vietnam

== Basketball ==
Event	Gold	Silver	Bronze
Boys'	Serbia; Saša Avramović; Marko Radonjić; Nemanja Bezbradica; Stefan Popovski-Turanjanin	Croatia; Matej Buovac; Tomislav Grubišić; Stipe Krstanović; Marko Ramljak	Greece; Theodoros Tsiloulis; Spyridon Panagiotaras; Lampros Vlachos; Emmanuel Tselentakis
Girls'	China; Shen Yi; Jin Jiabao; Yang Xi; Ma Xueya	Australia; Rosemary Fadljevic; Mikhaela Donnelly; Hannah Kaser; Olivia Bontempelli	United States; Briyona Canty; Andraya Carter; Amber Henson; Kiah Stokes

== Boxing ==
Event	Gold	Silver	Bronze
Men's 48 kg	Ryan Burnett; Ireland	Salman Alizada; Azerbaijan	Zohidjon Hoorboyev; Uzbekistan
Men's 51 kg	Emmanuel Rodríguez; Puerto Rico	Dj Maaki; Nauru	Hesham Abdelaal; Egypt
Men's 54 kg	Robeisy Eloy Ramirez; Cuba	Shiva Thapa; India	Dawid Michelus; Poland
Men's 57 kg	Artur Bril; Germany	Elvin Isayev; Azerbaijan	Fradimil Macayo; Venezuela
Men's 60 kg	Evaldas Petrauskas; Lithuania	Brett Mather; Australia	Krishan Vikas; India
Men's 64 kg	Ričardas Kuncaitis; Lithuania	Samuel Zapata; Venezuela	Fabián Maidana; Argentina
Men's 69 kg	David Lourenço; Brazil	Ahmad Mamadjanov; Uzbekistan	Nursahat Pazziyev; Turkmenistan
Men's 75 kg	Damien Hooper; Australia	Juan Carlos Carrillo; Colombia	Zoltán Harcsa; Hungary
Men's 81 kg	Irosvani Duverger; Cuba	Burak Aksin; Turkey	Sardorbek Begaliev; Uzbekistan
Men's 91 kg	Lenier Eunice Pero; Cuba	Fabio Turchi; Italy	Umit Can Patir; Turkey
Men's +91 kg	Tony Yoka; France	Joseph Parker; New Zealand	Daniil Svaresciuc; Moldova

== Canoeing ==
Event	Gold	Silver	Bronze
Boys' C1 sprint	Osvaldo Sacerio Cardenas; Cuba	Anatolii Melnyk; Ukraine	Pedro Castañeda; Mexico
Boys' C1 slalom	Wang Xiaodong; China	Dennis Soeter; Germany	Anatolii Melnyk; Ukraine
Boys' K1 sprint	Sándor Tótka; Hungary	Tom Liebscher; Germany	Inigo Garcia; Spain
Girls' K1 sprint	Ramóna Farkasdi; Hungary	Huang Jieyi; China	Hermien Peters; Belgium
Boys' K1 slalom	Simon Brus; Slovenia	Miroslav Urban; Slovakia	Jiří Prskavec; Czech Republic
Girls' K1 slalom	Jessica Fox; Australia	Pavlina Zasterova; Czech Republic	Viktoria Wolffhardt; Austria

== Cycling ==
Event	Gold	Silver	Bronze
Combined mixed team	Colombia; Jhonnatan Botero; Jessica Lergada; Brayan Ramírez; David Oquendo	Italy; Alessia Bulleri; Mattia Furlan; Nicolas Marini; Andrea Righettini	Netherlands; Twan van Gendt; Maartje Hereijgers; Friso Roscam Abbing; Thijs Zuurbier

== Diving ==
Event	Gold	Silver	Bronze
Boys' 3 m springboard	Qiu Bo; China	Oleksandr Bondar; Ukraine	Michael Hixon; United States
Girls' 3 m springboard	Liu Jiao; China	Pandelela Rinong Pamg; Malaysia	Viktoriya Potyekhina; Ukraine
Boys' 10 m platform	Qiu Bo; China	Oleksandr Bondar; Ukraine	Iván García; Mexico
Girls' 10 m platform	Liu Jiao; China	Pandelela Rinong Pamg; Malaysia	Sin Ji Hyang; North Korea

== Equestrian ==
Event	Gold	Silver	Bronze
Individual jumping	Marcelo Chirico; Uruguay	Mario Gamboa; Colombia	Dalma Rushdi H Malhas; Saudi Arabia
Team jumping	Europe; Martin Fuchs; Switzerland; Wojciech Dahlke; Poland; Valentina Isoardi; Italy; Carian Scudamore; Great Britain; Nicola Philippaerts; Belgium	Australasia; Lai Zin Man; Hong Kong; Jake Lambert; New Zealand; Xu Zhengyang; China; Sultan Al Tooqi; Oman; Thomas McDermott; Australia	Africa; Yara Hanssen; Zimbabwe; Zakaria Hamici; Algeria; Abduladim Mlitan; Libya; Mohamed Abdalla; Egypt; Samantha McIntosh; South Africa

== Fencing ==
Event	Gold	Silver	Bronze
Cadet male épée	Marco Fichera; Italy	Nikolaus Bodoczi; Germany	Alexandre Lyssov; Canada
Cadet female épée	Sheng Lin; China	Alberta Santuccio; Italy	Martyna Swatowska; Poland
Cadet male foil	Edoardo Luperi; Italy	Massialas Alexander; United States	Lee Hyun Kwang; South Korea
Cadet female foil	Camilla Mancini; Italy	Victoria Alexeeva; Russia	Dóra Lupkovics; Hungary
Cadet male sabre	Song Hun Jong; South Korea	Leonardo Affede; Italy	Richard Hübers; Germany
Cadet female sabre	Yana Egorian; Russia	Celina Merza; United States	Anja Musch; Germany
Mixed team	Europe 1 Yana Egorian; Russia; Marco Fichera; Italy; Camilla Mancini; Italy; Leonardo Affede; Italy; Alberta Santuccio; Italy; Edoardo Luperi; Italy	Europe 2 Anja Musch; Germany; Nikolaus Bodoczi; Germany; Victoria Alexeeva; Russia; Richard Hübers; Germany; Martyna Swatowska; Poland; Burak Tevfik Babaoglu; Turkey	Americas 1 Celina Merza; United States; Alexandre Lyssov; Canada; Allana Goldie; Canada; Will Spear; United States; Katharine Holmes; United States; Alexander Massilas; United States

== Field hockey ==
Event	Gold	Silver	Bronze
Boys'	Australia: Rory Middleton; Luke Noblett; Flynn Ogilvie; Jay Randhawa; Byron Walton; Jordan Willott; Oscar Wookey; Dylan Wotherspoon; Daniel Beale; Robert Bell; Andrew Butturini; Ryan Edge; Jake Farrell; Casey Hammond; Jeremy Hayward; Daniel Mathiesen	Pakistan: Mazhar Abbas; Muhammad Adnan; Muhammad Sultan Amir; Muhammad Amir Ashiq; Muhammad Usman Aslam; Ali Hassan Faraz; Muhammad Irfan; Muhammad Arslan Qadir; Muhammad Rizwan; Syed Kashif Shah; Adnan Shakoor; Ali Shan; Muhammad Sohaib; Muhammad Suleman; Muhammad Umair; Ahmed Zubair	Belgium: Quentin Bigare; Mathew Cobbaert; Dimitri Cuvelier; Nicolas de Kerpel; Bjorn Delmoitie; Arno Devreker; Matthias Dubois; Arnaud Flamand; Alexander Hendrickx; Antoine Legrain; Gaetan Perez; Louis Rombouts; Dorian Thiery; Benjamin van Dam; Thomas vander Gracht; Arthur van Doren
Girls'	Netherlands: Roos Broek; Lara Dell'Anna; Frederique Derkx; Saskia van Duivenboden; Jet de Graeff; Juliette van Hattum; Mathilde Hotting; Marloes Keetels; Lisanne de Lange; Liselotte van Mens; Elsie Nix; Floor Ouwerling; Floortje Plokker; Macey de Ruiter; Lisa Scheerlinck; Lieke van Wijk	Argentina: Agustina Albertarrio; Agustina Alvarez; Maria Baldoni; Antonieta Bianchi; Rocio Broccoli; Antonella Brondello; Camila Bustos; Victoria Cabut; Julia Castignioli; Jimena Cedres; Carla de Iure; Rocio Emme; Sol Fernandez; Eugenia Garrafo; Florencia Habif; Agustina Mama	New Zealand: Georgia Barnett; Amy Barry; Jamie Bolton; Jessica Chisholm; Michaela Curtis; Samara Dalziel; Rhiannon Dennison; Erin Goad; Elizabeth Keddell; Sarah Matthews; Rachel McCann; Kate McCaw; Elley Miller; Danielle Sutherland; Lydia Velzian; Kayla Wilson

== Football ==
Event	Gold	Silver	Bronze
Boys'	Bolivia: Jorge Alpire; Macallister Amutary; Carlos Anez; Cristian Arano; Luis Banegas; [Jhamil Bejarano; Osvaldo Daza; Pedro Galindo; Josue Gutrhie; Yasser Manzur; Marvin Martinez; Rodrigo Mejido; Alvaro Paz; Noel Rodriguez; Jorge Sabja; Gustavo Torrez; Romero Vaca; Harry Zegarra	Haiti: Jeff Alphonse; Wiliam Barthelemy; Junior Bonheur; Jean Bonhomme; Daniel Gedeon; Carlos Gluce; Ismael Hilaire; Whoopy Jean Baptiste; Sindy Louissaint; Nike Metellus; Jonathan Momplaisir; Jean Paraison; Jeff Petit Frere; Sandino Saint Jean; Sandro Saint Surin; Pierre Samedi; Robert Surpris; Bertrand Vilgrain	Singapore: Hamzah Fazil; Hazim Hassan; Dhukhilan Jeevamani; Radhi Kasim; Iskander Khairul; Brandon Koh; Illyas Lee; Jeffrey Lightfoot; Ammirul Mazlan; Irfan Mohamed; Syazwan Mohamed; Firdaus Mohd; Hanafi Mohd; Bryan Neubronner; Sunny Ng; Fashah Rosedin; Muhaimin Suhaimi; Jonathan Tan
Girls'	Chile: Gabriela Aguayo; Leslie Alarcón; Francisca Armijo; Julissa Barrera; Katherin Cisternas; Macarena Errázuriz; Fernanda Geroldi; Constanza González; Catalina González; Montserratt Grau; Paola Hinojosa; María Navarrete; Romina Orellana; Javiera Roa; Melisa Rodríguez; Karina Sepúlveda; Javiera Valencia; Macarena Vásquez	Equatorial Guinea: Justina Alene; María Angono; Inmaculada Angue; Mónica Asangono; Felicidad Avomo; Celestina Bikoro; Leticia Biyogo; Vida Fegue; Justina Lohoso; Rosa Mangue; Belinda Mikue; Pilar Monojeli; Dolores Nchama; Verónica Nchama; Judit Ndong; Felicidad Nguema; Antonia Obiang; Constancia Okomo	Turkey: Dilan Akarsu; Busra Ay; Kubra Aydin; Nazmiye Aytop; Fatma Barut; Hilal Baskol; Hulya Cin; Kader Dogan; Eda Duran; Medine Erkan; Yasam Goksu; Fatma Gulen; Eda Karatas; Umran Ozev; Busra Oztur; Esra Ozturk; Feride Serin; Melisa Tosun

== Gymnastics ==
=== Artistic ===
Event	Gold	Silver	Bronze
Men's individual all-around	Yuya Kamoto; Japan	Oleg Stepko; Ukraine	Zhu Xiaodong; China
Women's individual all-around	Viktoria Komova; Russia	Tan Sixin; China	Carlotta Ferlito; Italy
Women's balance beam	Tan Sixin; China	Carlotta Ferlito; Italy	Angela Donald; Australia
Men's floor	Ernesto Vila Sarria; Cuba	Oleg Stepko; Ukraine	Zhu Xiaodong; China
Women's floor	Tan Sixin; China	Diana Bulimar; Romania	Viktoria Komova; Russia
Men's horizontal bar	Sam Oldham; Great Britain	Néstor Abad; Spain	Zhu Xiaodong; China
Men's parallel bars	Oleg Stepko; Ukraine	Andrei Muntean; Romania	Ludovico Edalli; Italy
Men's pommel horse	Oleg Stepko; Ukraine	Sam Oldham; Great Britain	Daniil Kazchakov; Russia
Men's rings	Andrei Muntean; Romania	Yuya Kamoto; Japan	Néstor Abad; Spain
Women's uneven bars	Viktoria Komova; Russia	Tan Sixin; China	Jonna Adlerteg; Sweden
Men's vault	Ganbatyn Erdenebold; Mongolia	Ferhat Arıcan; Turkey	Néstor Abad; Spain
Women's vault	Viktoria Komova; Russia	María Vargas; Spain	Carlotta Ferlito; Italy

=== Rhythmic ===
Event	Gold	Silver	Bronze
Women's individual all-around	Alexandra Merkulova; Russia	Arina Charopa; Belarus	Jana Berezko-Marggrander; Germany
Women's group all-around	Russia; Ksenia Dudkina; Olga Ilyina; Karolina Sevastyanova; Alina Makarenko	Egypt; Farida Eid; Jacinthe Eldeeb; Manar Elgarf; Aicha Niazi	Canada; Katrina Cameron; Melodie Omidi; Angelika Reznik; Victoria Reznik

=== Trampoline ===
Event	Gold	Silver	Bronze
Boys' individual	Oleksandr Satin; Ukraine	He Yuxiang; China	Ginga Munetomo; Japan
Girls' individual	Dong Yu; China	Sviatlana Makshtrova; Belarus	Chisato Doihata; Japan

== Handball ==
Event	Gold	Silver	Bronze
Boys'	Egypt: Karim Abdelrhim; Aly Agamy; Abdelrahman Aly; Mohammed Maher; Mohamed Aly; Mostafa Awadalla; Mostafa Bechir; Omar Elmaarry; Kareem Elmenshawy; Mustafa Khalil; Ahmed Alwan; Ahmed Ibrahim; Alley Mohsen; Abdelrahman Shatta	South Korea: Choi Himin; Choi Hyeon Keun; Ha Min Ho; Hwang Do Yeop; Jang Insung; Kim Mingyu; Lee Han Sol; Lee Hyeon Sik; Lee Jeong Hwa; Lim Seung Hoon; Oh Sang Hwan; Park Hyung Geon; Yoo Hyun Ki; Yoo Sung Kyoung	France: Adrien Ballet Kebengue; Benjamin Bataille; Jordan Bonilauri; Théophile Causse; Théo Derot; Hugo Descat; Julian Emonet; Antoine Gutfreund; Bryan Jabea Njo; Laurent Lagier Pitre; Mathieu Merceron; Timothey N’Guessan; O’Brian Nyateu; Kévin Rondel
Girls'	Denmark: Mathilde Bjerregaard; Amanda Engelhardt Brogaard; Pernille Clausen; Rikke Ebbesen; Anne Sofie Ernstrøm; Camilla Fangel; Rikke Iversen; Mathilde Juncker; Camilla Madsen; Julie Parkhøi; Signe Pedersen; Nicoline Skals; Sara Smidemann; Cecilie Woller	Russia: Daria Vakhterova; Irina Zagaynova; Tamara Chopikyan; Nadezhda Koroleva; Oxana Korobkova; Nadezhda Pastukh; Anna Shukalova; Ksenia Milova; Veronika Garanina; Natalia Anisimova; Oxana Kondrashina; Natalia Danshina; Victoria Divak; Ekaterina Chernobrovina	Brazil: Ana Eduarda Vieira; Caroline Martins; Daise Souza; Deborah Nunes; Fernanda Marques; Francielle da Rocha; Isadora Garcia; Juliana de Araújo; Keila Alves; Laís da Silva; Larissa Araújo; Mirian Galvão; Patricia Batista da Silva; Thayanne Lopes

== Judo ==
Event	Gold	Silver	Bronze
Girls' 44 kg	Bae Seul-Bi; South Korea	Barbara Batizi; Hungary	Sothea Sam; Cambodia
Girls' 44 kg	Bae Seul-Bi; South Korea	Barbara Batizi; Hungary	Vita Valnova; Belarus
Girls' 52 kg	Katelyn Bouyssou; United States	Anna Dmitrieva; Russia	Ri Un Ju; North Korea
Girls' 52 kg	Katelyn Bouyssou; United States	Anna Dmitrieva; Russia	Christine Huck; Austria
Boys' 55 kg	David Pulkrábek; Czech Republic	Mansurkhuja Muminkhujaev; Uzbekistan	Dmytro Atanov; Ukraine
Boys' 55 kg	David Pulkrábek; Czech Republic	Mansurkhuja Muminkhujaev; Uzbekistan	Pedro Rivadulla; Spain
Girls' 63 kg	Miku Tashiro; Japan	Flávia Gomes; Brazil	Barbara Matić; Croatia
Girls' 63 kg	Miku Tashiro; Japan	Flávia Gomes; Brazil	Laura Naginskaitė; Lithuania
Boys' 66 kg	Maxamillian Schneider; United States	Hyon Song Chol; North Korea	Cai Phuc; Denmark
Boys' 66 kg	Maxamillian Schneider; United States	Hyon Song Chol; North Korea	Davit Ghazaryan; Armenia
Girls' 78 kg	Lola Mansour; Belgium	Natalia Kubin; Germany	Kseniya Darchuk; Ukraine
Girls' 78 kg	Lola Mansour; Belgium	Natalia Kubin; Germany	Urska Potocnik; Slovenia
Boys' 81 kg	Lee Jae-Hyung; South Korea	Khasan Khalmurzaev; Russia	Arpad Szakacs; Slovakia
Boys' 81 kg	Lee Jae-Hyung; South Korea	Khasan Khalmurzaev; Russia	Krisztian Toth; Hungary
Boys' 100 kg	Ryosuke Igarashi; Japan	Toma Nikiforov; Belgium	Marius Piepke; Germany
Boys' 100 kg	Ryosuke Igarashi; Japan	Toma Nikiforov; Belgium	Bolot Toktogonov; Kyrgyzstan
Mixed team	Alex García Mendoza Cuba; Lesly Cano Peru; Kairat Agibayev Kazakhstan; Andrea Krisandova Slovakia; Miku Tashiro Japan; Pedro Rivadulla Spain; Daryl Lokuku Ngambomo Democratic Republic of the Congo	Haley Baxter New Zealand; Marius Piepke Germany; Jennet Geldybayeva Turkmenistan; Otgonbayaryn Dölgöön Mongolia; Anna Dmitrieva Russia; Jeremy Saywell Malta; Lola Mansour Belgium; Babacar Cisse Senegal	Gaelle Nemorin Mauritius; Batuhan Efemgil Turkey; Seul Bi Bae South Korea; Fabio Basile Italy; Kevin Fernandez Honduras; Rotem Shor Israel; Kseniya Darchuk Ukraine; Patrik Ferreira Martins Andorra
Mixed team	Alex García Mendoza Cuba; Lesly Cano Peru; Kairat Agibayev Kazakhstan; Andrea Krisandova Slovakia; Miku Tashiro Japan; Pedro Rivadulla Spain; Daryl Lokuku Ngambomo Democratic Republic of the Congo	Haley Baxter New Zealand; Marius Piepke Germany; Jennet Geldybayeva Turkmenistan; Otgonbayaryn Dölgöön Mongolia; Anna Dmitrieva Russia; Jeremy Saywell Malta; Lola Mansour Belgium; Babacar Cisse Senegal	Christine Huck Austria; Eldin Omerovic Bosnia and Herzegovina; Neha Thakur India; Andrea Guillen Costa Rica; Mansurkhuja Muminkhujaev Uzbekistan; Barbara Matić Croatia; Pedro Pineda Venezuela; Ioan Visan Romania

== Modern pentathlon ==
Event	Gold	Silver	Bronze
Boys' individual	Kim Dae-Beom; South Korea	Ilya Shugarov; Russia	Jorge Camacho; Mexico
Girls' individual	Leydi Laura Moya Loprez; Cuba	Zsófia Földházi; Hungary	Anastasiya Spas; Ukraine
Mixed relay	Anastasiya Spas; Ukraine; Ilya Shugarov; Russia	Zhu Wenjing; China; Kim Dae-Beom; South Korea	Gulnaz Gubaydullina; Russia; Lukas Kontrimavicius; Lithuania

== Rowing ==
Event	Gold	Silver	Bronze
Boys' single sculls	Rolandas Maščinskas; Lithuania	Felix Bach; Germany	Ioan Prundeanu; Romania
Girls' single sculls	Judith Sievers; Germany	Nataliia Kovalova; Ukraine	Noemie Kober; France
Boys' pair	Slovenia; Jure Grace; Grega Domanjko	Greece; Michalis Nastopoulos; Apostolos Lampridis	Australia; Matthew Chochran; David Watts
Girls' pair	Great Britain; Georgia Howard-Merrill; Fiona Gammond	Australia; Emma Basher; Olympia Aldersey	Greece; Eleni Diamanti; Lydia Ntalamagka

== Sailing ==
Event	Gold	Silver	Bronze
Boys' Byte CII	Ian Barrows; Virgin Islands	Florian Haufe; Germany	Just Van Aanholt; Netherlands Antilles
Girls' Byte CII	Lara Vadlau; Austria	Daphne van der Vaart; Netherlands	Constanze Stolz; Germany
Boys' Techno 293	Mayan Rafic; Israel	Michael Cheng; Hong Kong	Kieran Martin; Great Britain
Girls' Techno 293	Siripon Kaewduang-Ngam; Thailand	Veronica Fanciulli; Italy	Audrey Yong; Singapore

== Shooting ==
Event	Gold	Silver	Bronze
Boys' 10 m air pistol	Denys Kushnirov; Ukraine	Felipe Almeida Wu; Brazil	Choi Dae-Han; South Korea
Girls' 10 m air pistol	Kim Jang-Mi; South Korea	Xue Fang; China	Geraldine Kate Solórzano; Guatemala
Boys' 10 m air rifle	Gao Ting Jie; China	Illia Charheika; Belarus	Serhiy Kulish; Ukraine
Girls' 10 m air rifle	Go Do-Won; South Korea	Gabriela Vognarova; Czech Republic	Jasmin Mischler; Switzerland

== Swimming ==
Event	Gold	Silver	Bronze
Boys' 50 m freestyle	Andriy Hovorov; Ukraine	Kenneth To; Australia	Aitor Martínez; Spain
Girls' 50 m freestyle	Tang Yi; China	No silver medal was awarded	Emma McKeon; Australia
Girls' 50 m freestyle	Anna Santamans; France	No silver medal was awarded	Emma McKeon; Australia
Boys' 100 m freestyle	Mehdy Metella; France	Velimir Stjepanović; Serbia	Kenneth To; Australia
Girls' 100 m freestyle	Tang Yi; China	Emma McKeon; Australia	Lauren Earp; Canada
Boys' 200 m freestyle	Andrey Ushakov; Russia	Cristian Quintero; Venezuela	Jeremy Bagshaw; Canada
Girls' 200 m freestyle	Tang Yi; China	Boglárka Kapás; Hungary	Emma McKeon; Australia
Boys' 400 m freestyle	Dai Jun; China	Chad le Clos; South Africa	Cristian Quintero; Venezuela
Girls' 400 m freestyle	Boglárka Kapás; Hungary	Kiera Janzen; United States	Ellie Faulkner; Great Britain
Boys' 50 m backstroke	Christian Homer; Trinidad and Tobago	Rainer Ng; Singapore	Max Akerman; Australia
Boys' 50 m backstroke	Christian Homer; Trinidad and Tobago	Rainer Ng; Singapore	Abdullah Altuwaini; Kuwait
Girls' 50 m backstroke	Mathilde Cini; France	Daryna Zevina; Ukraine	Alexandra Papusha; Russia
Boys' 100 m backstroke	He Jianbin; China	Yakov Toumarkin; Israel	Lavrans Solli; Norway
Girls' 100 m backstroke	Daryna Zevina; Ukraine	Bai Anqi; China	Alexandra Papusha; Russia
Boys' 200 m backstroke	Péter Bernek; Hungary	Yakov Toumarkin; Israel	Balazs Zambo; Hungary
Girls' 200 m backstroke	Bai Anqi; China	Kaitlyn Jones; United States	Daryna Zevina; Ukraine
Boys' 50 m breaststroke	Ivan Capan; Croatia	Nicholas Schafer; Australia	Razvan Tudosie; Romania
Girls' 50 m breaststroke	Rachel Nicol; Canada	Martina Carraro; Italy	Ana de Pinho Rodrigues; Portugal
Boys' 100 m breaststroke	Nicholas Schafer; Australia	Anton Lobanov; Russia	Flavio Bizzarri; Italy
Girls' 100 m breaststroke	Tera van Beilen; Canada	Emily Selig; Australia	Rachel Nicol; Canada
Boys' 200 m breaststroke	Flavio Bizzarri; Italy	Anton Lobanov; Russia	Nicholas Schafer; Australia
Girls' 200 m breaststroke	Emily Selig; Australia	Tera van Beilen; Canada	Maya Hamano; Japan
Boys' 50 m butterfly	Andriy Hovorov; Ukraine	Chang Gyucheol; South Korea	Tommaso Romani; Italy
Girls' 50 m butterfly	Liu Lan; China	Elena di Liddo; Italy	Anna Santamans; France
Boys' 100 m butterfly	Chang Gyucheol; South Korea	Chad le Clos; South Africa	Velimir Stjepanović; Serbia
Girls' 100 m butterfly	Liu Lan; China	Judit Ignacio; Spain	Rachael Kelly; Great Britain
Boys' 200 m butterfly	Bence Biczó; Hungary	Chad le Clos; South Africa	Marcin Cieślak; Poland
Girls' 200 m butterfly	Boglárka Kapás; Hungary	Judit Ignacio; Spain	Liu Lan; China
Boys' 200 m individual medley	Chad le Clos; South Africa	Kenneth To; Australia	Dylan Bosch; South Africa
Girls' 200 m individual medley	Kaitlyn Jones; United States	Kristina Kochetkova; Russia	Barbora Závadová; Czech Republic
Boys' 4 × 100 m freestyle relay	Russia; Andrey Ushakov; Alexey Atsapkin; Ilya Lemaev; Anton Lobanov	China; Sun Bowei; Dai Jun; Wang Ximing; He Jianbin	South Africa; Chad le Clos; Murray McDougall; Dylan Bosch; Pierre Keune
Girls' 4 × 100 m freestyle relay	China; Liu Lan; Bai Anqi; Wang Chang; Tang Yi	Germany; Juliane Reinhold; Lena Kalla; Dorte Baumert; Lina Rathsack	Canada; Lindsay Delmar; Tera van Beilen; Rachel Nicol; Lauren Earp
Mixed 4 × 100 m freestyle relay	China; Sun Bowei; Tang Yi; Liu Lan; He Jianbin	Australia; Kenneth To; Emma McKeon; Madison Wilson; Justin James	France; Mehdy Metella; Anna Santamans; Mathilde Cini; Jordan Coelho
Boys' 4 × 100 m medley relay	Australia; Max Ackermann; Nicholas Schafer; Kenneth To; Justin James	France; Ganesh Pedurand; Thomas Rabeisen; Jordan Coelho; Mehdy Metella	Germany; Christian Diener; Christian vom Lehn; Melvin Herrmann; Kevin Leithold
Girls' 4 × 100 m medley relay	Australia; Madison Wilson; Emily Selig; Zoe Johnson; Emma McKeon	Russia; Alexandra Papusha; Olga Detenyuk; Kristina Kochetkova; Ekaterina Andreeva	Germany; Dorte Baumert; Lina Rathsack; Lena Kalla; Juliane Reinhold
Mixed 4 × 100 m medley relay	China; He Jianbin; Wang Ximing; Liu Lan; Tang Yi	Russia; Alexandra Papusha; Anton Lobanov; Kristina Kochetkova; Andrey Ushakov	Australia; Max Ackerman; Emily Selig; Kenneth To; Emma McKeon

== Table tennis ==
Event	Gold	Silver	Bronze
Men's singles	Koki Niwa; Japan	Hung Tzu-Hsiang; Chinese Taipei	Simon Gauzy; France
Women's singles	Gu Yuting; China	Isabelle Li Siyun; Singapore	Yang Ha Eun; South Korea
Mixed team	Japan; Koki Niwa; Ayuka Tanioka	South Korea; Kim Dong Hyun; Yang Ha Eun	Gu Yuting; China; Adem Hmam; Tunisia

== Taekwondo ==
Event	Gold	Silver	Bronze
Girls' 44 kg	Anastasia Valueva; Russia	Iryna Romoldanova; Ukraine	Şeyma Tuncer; Turkey
Girls' 44 kg	Anastasia Valueva; Russia	Iryna Romoldanova; Ukraine	Shukrona Sharifova; Tajikistan
Boys' 48 kg	Gili Haimovitz; Israel	Mohammad Soleimani; Iran	Gregory English; United States
Boys' 48 kg	Gili Haimovitz; Israel	Mohammad Soleimani; Iran	Lucas Guzman; Argentina
Girls' 49 kg	Worawong Pongpanit; Thailand	Dana Haidar; Jordan	Jessie Bates; United States
Girls' 49 kg	Worawong Pongpanit; Thailand	Dana Haidar; Jordan	Melanie Phan; Canada
Boys' 55 kg	Kaveh Rezaei; Iran	Nursultan Mamayev; Kazakhstan	Daryl Tan; Singapore
Boys' 55 kg	Kaveh Rezaei; Iran	Nursultan Mamayev; Kazakhstan	Nguyen Quoc Cuong; Vietnam
Girls' 55 kg	Jade Jones; Great Britain	Nguyen Thanh Thao; Vietnam	Jennifer Agren; Sweden
Girls' 55 kg	Jade Jones; Great Britain	Nguyen Thanh Thao; Vietnam	Shafinas Abdul Rahman; Singapore
Boys' 63 kg	Seo Byeong-Deok; South Korea	Mário Silva; Portugal	Alejandro Valdés; Mexico
Boys' 63 kg	Seo Byeong-Deok; South Korea	Mário Silva; Portugal	Berkcan Süngü; Turkey
Girls' 63 kg	Jeon Soo-Yeon; South Korea	Antonia Katheder; Germany	Nagore Irigoien; Spain
Girls' 63 kg	Jeon Soo-Yeon; South Korea	Antonia Katheder; Germany	Samantha Silvestri; France
Girls' +63 kg	Zheng Shuyin; China	Briseida Acosta; Mexico	Yuleimi Abreu; Cuba
Girls' +63 kg	Zheng Shuyin; China	Briseida Acosta; Mexico	Faiza Taoussara; France
Boys' 73 kg	Kim Jin-Hak; South Korea	Aliaskhab Sirazhov; Russia	Maksym Dominishyn; Ukraine
Boys' 73 kg	Kim Jin-Hak; South Korea	Aliaskhab Sirazhov; Russia	Michel Samaha; Lebanon
Boys' +73 kg	Liu Chang; China	Ibrahim Ahmadsei; Germany	Stefan Bozalo; Canada
Boys' +73 kg	Liu Chang; China	Ibrahim Ahmadsei; Germany	Yazan Al-Sadeq; Jordan

== Tennis ==
Event	Gold	Silver	Bronze
Boys' singles	Juan Sebastián Gómez; Colombia	Yuki Bhambri; India	Damir Džumhur; Bosnia and Herzegovina
Girls' singles	Daria Gavrilova; Russia	Zheng Saisai; China	Jana Čepelová; Slovakia
Boys' doubles	Oliver Golding; Great Britain; Jiří Veselý; Czech Republic	Russia; Victor Baluda; Mikhail Biryukov	Slovakia; Filip Horanský; Jozef Kovalík
Girls' doubles	China; Tang Haochen; Zheng Saisai	Slovakia; Jana Čepelová; Chantal Škamlová	Tímea Babos; Hungary; An-Sophie Mestach; Belgium

== Triathlon ==
Event	Gold	Silver	Bronze
Boys'	Aaron Barclay; New Zealand	Kevin McDowell; United States	Alois Knabl; Austria
Girls'	Yuka Sato; Japan	Ellie Salthouse; Australia	Kelly Whitley; United States
Mixed relay	Europe 1 Eszter Dudás; Hungary; Miguel Valente Gernandes; Portugal; Fanny Beisaron; Israel; Alois Knabl; Austria	Oceania 1 Ellie Salthouse; Australia; Michael Gosman; Australia; Maddie Dillon; New Zealand; Aaron Barclay; New Zealand	Americas 1 Kelly Whitley; United States; Kevin McDowell; United States; Adriana Barraza; Mexico; Lautaro Diaz; Argentina

== Volleyball ==
Event	Gold	Silver	Bronze
Boys'	Cuba: Wilfredo Leon; Alejandro González (volleyball); Carlos Araujo (volleyball); Juan Andres Leon; Alexis Lamadrid; Yonder Garcia; Yulian Duran; Daniel Albo; Nelson Loyola; Yassel Perdomo	Argentina: Mauro Llanos; Luciano Verasio; Leonardo Plaza; Frederico Martina; Gonzalo Lapera; Ramiro Nunez; Esteban Martinez; Gonzalo Quiroga; Tomás Ruiz; Ezequiel Palacios; Nicolas Mendez; Damián Villalba	Russia: Vladimir Manerov; Bogdan Glivenko; Ivan Komarov (volleyball); Dmitriy Solodilin; Valentin Golubev; Aleksander Shchurin; Filipp Mokievskiy; Alexey Tertyshnikov; Konstantin Osipov; Ilya Nikitin; Vadim Zolotukhin; Maxim Kulikov
Girls'	Belgium: Laurine Klinkenberg; Laura Heyrman; Delfien Brugman; Elien Ruysschaert; Ilka van de Vyver; Lore van den Vonder; Sophie van Nimmen; Mira Juwet; Karolien Vleugels; Tara Lauwers; Lotte Penders; Valerie El Houssine	United States: Samantha Cash; Crystal Graff; Micha Hancock; Natalie Hayes; Christina Higgins; Madison Kamp; Elizabeth McMahon; Katherine Mitchell; Tiffany Morales; Olivia Okoro; Taylor Simpson; Laura Teknipp	Peru: Cary Vasquez; Brenda Daniela Uribe; Grecia Herrada; Maria Acosta; Vivian Baella; Alexandra Muñoz; Lisset Sosa; Katerinne Olemar; Raffaella Camet; Diana Gonzales; Clarivett Yllescas; Sandra Chumacero

== Weightlifting ==
Event	Gold	Silver	Bronze
Girls' 48 kg	Tian Yuan; China	Sirivimon Pramongkhol; Thailand	Génesis Rodríguez; Venezuela
Girls' 53 kg	Boyanka Kostova; Bulgaria	Kuo Hsing-Chun; Chinese Taipei	Safitri Dewl; Indonesia
Boys' 56 kg	Thach Kim Tuan; Vietnam	Xie Jiawu; China	Smbat Margaryan; Armenia
Girls' 58 kg	Deng Wei; China	Zulfiya Chinshanlo; Kazakhstan	Racheal Ekoshoria; Nigeria
Boys' 62 kg	Song Chol Kim; North Korea	José Mena; Colombia	Emre Buyukunlu; Turkey
Girls' 63 kg	Zhazira Zhapparkul; Kazakhstan	Diana Akhmetova; Russia	Aremi Fuentes; Mexico
Girls' +63 kg	Olga Zubova; Russia	Chitchanok Pulsabsakul; Thailand	Kuk Hyang Kim; North Korea
Boys' 69 kg	Nijat Rahimov; Azerbaijan	Xingbin Gong; China	Ediel Marquez Ona; Cuba
Boys' 77 kg	Artem Okulov; Russia	Chatuphum Chinnawong; Thailand	Rustem Sybay; Kazakhstan
Boys' 85 kg	Georgi Shikov; Bulgaria	Alexey Kosov; Russia	Kostyantyn Reva; Ukraine
Boys' +85 kg	Alireza Kazeminejad; Iran	Gor Minasyan; Armenia	Hassan Mohamed; Egypt

== Wrestling ==
Event	Gold	Silver	Bronze
Boys' freestyle 46 kg	Aldar Balzhinimaev; Russia	Mehran Sheikhi; Iran	Artak Hovhannisyan; Armenia
Girls' freestyle 46 kg	Yu Miyahara; Japan	Lulia Leorda; Moldova	Petra Olli; Finland
Girls' freestyle 52 kg	Patimat Bagomedova; Azerbaijan	Yuan Yuan; China	Nilufar Gadaeva; Uzbekistan
Boys' freestyle 54 kg	Yuki Takahashi; Japan	Kanan Guluyev; Azerbaijan	Mehmet Ali Daylak; Turkey
Girls' freestyle 60 kg	Baatarzorigyn Battsetseg; Mongolia	Pooja Dhanda; India	Svetlana Lipatova; Russia
Boys' freestyle 63 kg	Azamatbi Pshnatlov; Russia	Bakhodur Kadarov; Tajikistan	Irakli Mosidze; Georgia
Girls' freestyle 70 kg	Dorothy Yeats; Canada	Jinju Moon; South Korea	Karyna Stankova; Ukraine
Boys' freestyle 76 kg	Rasul Kalayci; Turkey	Jordan Rogers; United States	Dierbek Ergashev; Uzbekistan
Boys' freestyle 100 kg	Ali Magomedabirov; Azerbaijan	Abraham de Jesus Conyedo Ruano; Cuba	Satyawart Kadian; India
Boys' Greco-Roman 42 kg	Murad Bazarov; Azerbaijan	Yosvanys Peña Flores; Cuba	Akan Baimaganbetov; Kazakhstan
Boys' Greco-Roman 50 kg	Elman Mukhtarov; Azerbaijan	Vacant^{[A]}	Shadybek Sulaimanov; Kyrgyzstan
Boys' Greco-Roman 58 kg	Urmatbek Amatov; Kyrgyzstan	Olexandr Lytvynov; Ukraine	Artur Suleymanov; Russia
Boys' Greco-Roman 69 kg	Zhanlbek Kandybayev; Kazakhstan	Musa Gedik; Turkey	Yousef Ghaderian; Iran
Boys' Greco-Roman 85 kg	Ruslan Adzhigov; Russia	Hamdy Abdelwahab; Egypt	Ruslan Kamilov; Uzbekistan

== Medal winner changes ==
A. On 15 October 2010, the International Olympic Committee announced that Nurbek Hakkulov, who won a silver medal for Uzbekistan in wrestling, and Johnny Pilay who finished fifth in a separate wrestling event for Ecuador, had tested positive for a banned diuretic, furosemide. Both were disqualified and Hakkulov was stripped of his silver medal, although no decision was taken on whether to promote Shadybek Sulaimanov and Johan Rodriguez Banguela in the event.

== Medal leaders ==
Athletes that won at least three medals or two gold medals are listed below.

Athlete	Nation	Sport	Gold	Silver	Bronze	Total
Tang Yi	China	Swimming	6	0	0	6
Liu Lan	China	Swimming	5	0	1	6
Viktoria Komova	Russia	Gymnastics	3	0	1	4
He Jianbin	China	Swimming	3	1	0	4
Oleg Stepko	Ukraine	Gymnastics	2	2	0	4
Tan Sixin	China	Gymnastics	2	2	0	4
Emily Selig	Australia	Swimming	2	1	1	4
Nicholas Schafer	Australia	Swimming	2	1	1	4
Andrey Ushakov	Russia	Swimming	2	1	0	3
Bai Anqi	China	Swimming	2	1	0	3
Boglárka Kapás	Hungary	Swimming	2	1	0	3
Andriy Hovorov	Ukraine	Swimming	2	0	0	2
Camilla Mancini	Italy	Fencing	2	0	0	2
Edoardo Luperi	Italy	Fencing	2	0	0	2
Koki Niwa	Japan	Table tennis	2	0	0	2
Liu Jiao	China	Diving	2	0	0	2
Marco Fichera	Italy	Fencing	2	0	0	2
Odean Skeen	Jamaica	Athletics	2	0	0	2
Qiu Bo	China	Diving	2	0	0	2
Robin Reynolds	United States	Athletics	2	0	0	2
Yana Egorian	Russia	Fencing	2	0	0	2
Kenneth To	Australia	Swimming	1	3	2	6
Chad le Clos	South Africa	Swimming	1	3	1	5
Anton Lobanov	Russia	Swimming	1	3	0	4
Daryna Zevina	Ukraine	Swimming	1	1	1	3
Mehdy Metella	France	Swimming	1	1	1	3
Tera van Beilen	Canada	Swimming	1	1	1	3
Rachel Nicol	Canada	Swimming	1	0	2	3
Kristina Kochetkova	Russia	Swimming	0	3	0	3
Alexandra Papusha	Russia	Swimming	0	2	2	4
Carlotta Ferlito	Italy	Gymnastics	0	1	2	3
Néstor Abad	Spain	Gymnastics	0	1	2	3
Zhu Xiaodong	China	Gymnastics	0	0	3	3
