= Boxing at the 2010 Summer Youth Olympics =

Boxing at the I Summer Youth Olympic Games
- Venue: Suntec Singapore Convention and Exhibition Centre
- Dates: 21 – 25 August 2010
- No. of events: 11 (11 boys, 0 girls)
- Competitors: 66 from 48 nations

The Boxing competition at the 2010 Summer Youth Olympics was held from 21 August to 25 August 2010 at the Suntec Singapore International Convention and Exhibition Centre.

== Qualification ==
NOC	Boys											Total
NOC	-48 kg	-51 kg	-54 kg	-57 kg	-60 kg	-64 kg	-69 kg	-75 kg	-81 kg	-91 kg	+91 kg	Total
Afghanistan						X						1
Argentina						X						1
Armenia					X							1
Australia					X			X				2
Azerbaijan	X	X		X								3
Belarus	X											1
Brazil							X					1
Bulgaria				X								1
Colombia								X				1
Cuba			X						X	X		3
Czech Republic				X								1
Ecuador									X			1
Egypt		X										1
France											X	1
Germany				X	X		X					3
Great Britain			X									1
Greece											X	1
Grenada		X										1
Hungary								X			X	2
India			X		X							2
Iran									X			1
Ireland	X							X				2
Italy										X		1
Kazakhstan								X				1
Kyrgyzstan							X					1
Lithuania					X	X						2
Mexico					X							1
Moldova											X	1
Mongolia				X								1
Nauru		X										1
New Zealand											X	1
Nigeria								X				1
Poland			X									1
Puerto Rico		X										1
Russia		X							X	X		3
Rwanda	X											1
Saint Lucia						X						1
Seychelles			X									1
Singapore	X											1
South Korea			X									1
Tajikistan										X		1
Turkey									X	X		2
Turkmenistan							X					1
Ukraine						X					X	2
United States										X		1
Uzbekistan	X						X		X			3
Venezuela				X		X						2
Zambia							X					1
48 NOCs	6	6	6	6	6	6	6	6	6	6	6	66

== Schedule ==
Event date	Event day	Approx. duration	Starting time	Event details
21 August	Saturday	7:00 Hrs	2:00 pm	Men's Preliminary
22 August	Sunday	7:00 Hrs	2:00 pm	Men's Semi-Final
23 August	Monday	3:00 Hrs	6:00 pm	Men's Ranking
24 August	Tuesday	3:00 Hrs	6:00 pm	Men's Ranking
25 August	Wednesday	6:00 Hrs	2:00 pm	Men's Finals

== Medal summary ==
=== Medal table ===
Rank	Nation	Gold	Silver	Bronze	Total
1	Cuba	3	0	0	3
2	Lithuania	2	0	0	2
3	Australia	1	1	0	2
4	Brazil	1	0	0	1
4	France	1	0	0	1
4	Germany	1	0	0	1
4	Ireland	1	0	0	1
4	Puerto Rico	1	0	0	1
9	Azerbaijan	0	2	0	2
10	Uzbekistan	0	1	2	3
11	India	0	1	1	2
11	Turkey	0	1	1	2
11	Venezuela	0	1	1	2
14	Colombia	0	1	0	1
14	Italy	0	1	0	1
14	Nauru	0	1	0	1
14	New Zealand	0	1	0	1
18	Argentina	0	0	1	1
18	Egypt	0	0	1	1
18	Hungary	0	0	1	1
18	Moldova	0	0	1	1
18	Poland	0	0	1	1
18	Turkmenistan	0	0	1	1
Totals (23 entries)		11	11	11	33

=== Events ===
Event	Gold	Silver	Bronze
Men's 48 kg	Ryan Burnett; Ireland	Salman Alizade; Azerbaijan	Zohidjon Hoorboyev; Uzbekistan
Men's 51 kg	Emmanuel Rodríguez; Puerto Rico	Dj Maaki; Nauru	Hesham Abdelaal; Egypt
Men's 54 kg	Robeisy Ramírez; Cuba	Shiva Thapa; India	Dawid Michelus; Poland
Men's 57 kg	Artur Bril; Germany	Elvin Isayev; Azerbaijan	Fradimil Macayo; Venezuela
Men's 60 kg	Evaldas Petrauskas; Lithuania	Brett Mather; Australia	Vikas Krishan Yadav; India
Men's 64 kg	Ričardas Kuncaitis; Lithuania	Samuel Zapata; Venezuela	Fabián Maidana; Argentina
Men's 69 kg	David Lourenço; Brazil	Ahmad Mamadjanov; Uzbekistan	Nursahat Pazziyev; Turkmenistan
Men's 75 kg	Damien Hooper; Australia	Juan Carlos Carrillo; Colombia	Zoltán Harcsa; Hungary
Men's 81 kg	Irosvani Duverger; Cuba	Burak Aksın; Turkey	Sardorbek Begaliev; Uzbekistan
Men's 91 kg	Lenier Eunice Pero; Cuba	Fabio Turchi; Italy	Ümit Can Patır; Turkey
Men's +91 kg	Tony Yoka; France	Joseph Parker; New Zealand	Daniil Svaresciuc; Moldova
