= Nkiruka Florence Nwakwe =

Nigerian sprinter and hurdler

Personal information
- Nickname: Nwakwe
- Nationality: Nigerian
- Born: 1994 (age 31–32) Nigeria
- Height: 164 cm (5 ft 5 in)
- Weight: 59 kg (130 lb)

Sport
- Country: Nigeria.
- Sport: Sprinter athlete

Achievements and titles
- Olympic finals: Junior
- National finals: Junior level
Medal record
Women's athletics
Representing Nigeria
Summer Youth Olympics
Gold medal – first place	2010 Singapore	200 m
Silver medal – second place	2010 Singapore	4*100 m relay

Nkiruka Florence Nwakwe (born c. 1994), also known as Nkiruka Nwakwe, is a Nigerian sprinter and hurdler. She competed at local and international level representing Nigeria in female athletics competitions.

== Career ==
Nkiruka Florence Nwakwe started her career as a junior sprint runner and hurdler in Nigeria where she competes in various local competitions. She won her major competitive gold medal at the 2010 Summer Youth Olympics in Athletics at 200 the metres events and also sparticipated at The women's 4 × 100 metres relay at the 2012 World Junior Championships in Athletics in Athletics which was held at the Estadi Olímpic Lluís Companys on 13 and 14 July, she also participated in the African 4 × 400 m relay team that won silver medals at the 2010 Summer Youth Olympics with Josephine Omaka from Nigeria, Izelle Neuhoff from South Africa and Bukola Abogunloko another Nigerian.

== Achievements ==
Medal	Name	Sport	Event	Date
Gold	Josephine Omaka	Athletics	Girls' 100m	21 Aug
Silver	Josephine Omaka; Nkiruka Florence Nwakwe; Bukola Abogunloko	Athletics	Girls' Medley Relay	23 Aug
Bronze	Bukola Abogunloko	Athletics	Girls' 400m	21 Aug

=== Girls ===
Track and road events

Athletes	Event	Qualification		Final	
Athletes	Event	Result	Rank	Result	Rank
Nkiruka Florence Nwakwe	Girls’ 100m	11.82	4 Q	23.46	Gold medal
Josephine Omaka (NGR); Nkiruka Florence Nwakwe (NGR); Izelle Neuhoff (RSA); Bukola Abogunloko (NGR)	Girls’ Medley Relay			2:06.19	Silver medal

Field Events

Athletes	Event	Qualification		Final	
Athletes	Event	Result	Rank	Result	Rank
Nkechi Leticia Chime	Girls’ Shot Put	13.99	6 Q	14.16	7

=== National Olympic Committees (NOCs), mixed-NOCs teams in the 2010 Summer Youth Olympics ===
Event	Gold	Silver	Bronze
Girls' medley relay	Americas; Myasia Jacobs (USA); Tynia Gaither (BAH); Rashan Brown (BAH); Robin Reynolds (USA)	Africa; Josephine Omaka (NGR); Nkiruka Florence Nwakwe (NGR); Izelle Neuhoff (RSA); Bukola Abogunloko (NGR)	Europe; Annie Tagoe (GBR); Anna Bongiorni (ITA); Sonja Mosler (GER); Bianca Răzor (ROU)

== Personal bests ==
- 200 metres – 23.46 (2010)
- 200 metres – 24.55 – Nsukka (NGR) – 21 APR 2012

== See also ==
- Omolade Akinremi
- Josephine Omaka
