= Josephine Omaka =

Nigerian sprinter and hurdler

Personal information
- Full name: Josephine Ada Omaka
- Nationality: Nigerian
- Born: Josephine Ada; 29 November 1993 (age 32) Nigeria
- Height: 163 cm (5 ft 4 in)
- Weight: 58 kg (128 lb)

Sport
- Country: Nigeria
- Sport: Sprinter athlete
Medal record
Women's Athletics
Representing Nigeria
Summer Youth Olympics
Gold medal – first place	2010 Singapore	100 m
Silver medal – second place	2010 Singapore	4*100 m relay
African Junior Championships
Gold medal – first place	2009 Bambous	100 m
Gold medal – first place	2011 Gaborone	100 m
Silver medal – second place	2011 Gaborone	4*100 m relay

Josephine Ada Omaka (born 29 November 1993) is a Nigerian sprinter and hurdler. She competed at local and international competitions in athletics representing Nigeria.

== Career ==
Josephine Ada Omaka started her career as a junior sprinter and hurdler in Nigeria where she competes in various local competitions. In 2010, she dropped out of the AFN Golden League due to a backlog of academic work, but she bounced back the same year. She won gold medals at the 2011 African Junior Championships and 2010 Summer Youth Olympics at 100 metres. She also participated in the women's 4 × 100 metres relay at the 2012 World Junior Championships held at the Estadi Olímpic Lluís Companys on 13 and 14 July, and also won the 2009 African Junior Championships event in the 100 metres and another silver in the 4 × 100 m relay in 2009 competition with Margaret Benson, Goodness Thomas and Wisdom Isoken.

Furthermore, she participated in the African 4 × 400 m relay team that won silver medals at the 2010 Summer Youth Olympics with Nkiruka Florence Nwakwe, Izelle Neuhoff and Bukola Abogunloko.

== Achievements ==
Medal	Name	Sport	Event	Date
Gold	Josephine Omaka	Athletics	Girls' 100m	21 Aug
Silver	Josephine Omaka; Nkiruka Florence Nwakwe; Bukola Abogunloko	Athletics	Girls' Medley Relay	23 Aug
Bronze	Bukola Abogunloko	Athletics	Girls' 400m	21 Aug

=== Girls ===
Track and road events

Athletes	Event	Qualification		Final	
Athletes	Event	Result	Rank	Result	Rank
Josephine Omaka	Girls’ 100m	11.82	4 Q	11.58	Gold medal
Josephine Omaka (NGR); Nkiruka Florence Nwakwe (NGR); Izelle Neuhoff (RSA); Bukola Abogunloko (NGR)	Girls’ Medley Relay			2:06.19	Silver medal

Field events

Athletes	Event	Qualification		Final	
Athletes	Event	Result	Rank	Result	Rank
Nkechi Leticia Chime	Girls’ Shot Put	13.99	6 Q	14.16	7

=== National Olympic Committees (NOCs), mixed-NOCs teams in the 2010 Summer Youth Olympics ===
Event	Gold	Silver	Bronze
Girls' medley relay	Americas; Myasia Jacobs (USA); Tynia Gaither (BAH); Rashan Brown (BAH); Robin Reynolds (USA)	Africa; Josephine Omaka (NGR); Nkiruka Florence Nwakwe (NGR); Izelle Neuhoff (RSA); Bukola Abogunloko (NGR)	Europe; Annie Tagoe (GBR); Anna Bongiorni (ITA); Sonja Mosler (GER); Bianca Răzor (ROU)

== Personal bests ==
- 100 metres hurdles – 12.98 s (2009)
- 100 metres – 11.09 s (2011)
- 100 metres – 11.40 – +1.3 Lagos (NGR) – 30 April 2010
- 100 metres – 11.1h * – +1.0 – Abuja (NGR) – 1 July 2008
- 200 metres – 24.55 – Nsukka (NGR) – 21 April 2012
- 4 × 100 metres Relay – 44.58 – Estadio Olímpico, Barcelona (ESP) – 13 July 2012
- Medley Relay – 2:06.19 – Singapore (SGP) – 23 August 2010

=== Season bests ===
- 100 metres – 12.37 _ -0.1 – Sapele (NGR) – 21 May 2016
