= Fofanah =

Fofanah may refer to:

- Abu Bakarr Fofanah, Sierra Leonean politician
- Alusine Fofanah (politician), Sierra Leonean politician
- Alusine Fofanah (footballer) (born 1997), Sierra Leonean footballer
- Fatmata Fofanah (born 1985), Guinean footballer
- Ibrahim Fofanah (born 1994), Sierra Leonean footballer
- Isatu Fofanah (politician) (born 1958), Sierra Leonean politician
- Isatu Fofanah (athlete) (born 1993), Canadian sprinter
- Nabie Foday Fofanah (born 1980), Guinean sprinter
