= Isatu Fofanah =

Isatu Fofanah can refer to:

- Isatu Fofanah (athlete) (born 1993), a Canadian athlete
- Isatu Fofanah (politician) (born 1958), a Sierra Leonean politician
