= Boxing at the 2010 Summer Youth Olympics – Men's 51 kg =

Boxing competitions

These are the results of the Men's Fly 51 kg competition in boxing at the 2010 Summer Youth Olympics in Singapore. Preliminaries were held on August 21, semifinals on August 22, 5th place bout on August 23, the bronze medal bout on August 24 and the Final bout on August 25. Unlike world championships and the Olympic Games, only one bronze medal is awarded.

== Medalists ==
Emmanuel Rodriguez
Puerto Rico
Dj Maaki
Nauru
Hesham Abdelaal
Egypt

== Results ==
Preliminaries
Shaban Shahpalangov (AZE)	4
Hesham Abdelaal (EGY)	8
Emmanuel Rodriguez (PUR)	11
Vasiliy Vetkin (RUS)	4

Semifinals
Dj Maaki (NRU)	5+
Kandel Dowden (GRN)	5
Hesham Abdelaal (EGY)	1
Emmanuel Rodriguez (PUR)	10

Final
Dj Maaki (NRU)
Emmanuel Rodriguez (PUR)	RSC
Third place
Kandel Dowden (GRN)
Hesham Abdelaal (EGY)	DSQ

5th place bout
Shaban Shahpalangov (AZE)	8
Vasiliy Vetkin (RUS)	11
