= Nauru at the 2010 Summer Youth Olympics =

- IOC code: NRU
- NOC: Nauru Olympic Committee

in Singapore
- Competitors: 4 in 3 sports
- Flag bearer: Elson Brechtefeld
- Medals Ranked 74th: Gold 0 Silver 1 Bronze 0 Total 1

Summer Youth Olympics appearances
- 2010; 2014; 2018

Nauru participated in the 2010 Summer Youth Olympics in Singapore.

The Nauru squad consisted of 4 athletes competing in 3 sports: athletics, boxing and weightlifting.

== Medalists ==
Medal	Name	Sport	Event	Date
Silver	Dj Maaki	Boxing	Men's Fly 51kg	25 Aug

== Athletics ==
=== Girls ===
Track and Road Events

Athletes	Event	Qualification		Final	
Athletes	Event	Result	Rank	Result	Rank
Lovelite Detenamo	Girls’ 100m	13.04	21 qC	DNS	
Thrixeena Akua	Girls’ 200m	30.27	18 qC	30.08	17

== Boxing ==
Boys

Athlete	Event	Preliminaries	Semifinals	Final	Rank
Dj Maaki	Flyweight (51kg)		Kandel Dowden (GRN); W 5+-5	Emmanuel Rodriguez (PUR); L RSC R3 1:34	Silver medal

== Weightlifting ==
Boys

Athlete	Event	Snatch	Clean & Jerk	Total	Rank
Elson Brechtefeld	56kg	92	117	209	9
