= Grenada at the 2010 Summer Youth Olympics =

- IOC code: GRN
- NOC: The Grenada Olympic Committee

in Singapore
- Competitors: 6 in 3 sports
- Flag bearer: Lindon Toussaint
- Medals: Gold 0 Silver 0 Bronze 0 Total 0

Summer Youth Olympics appearances
- 2010; 2014; 2018

Grenada participated in the 2010 Summer Youth Olympics in Singapore.

The Grenada team consisted of 6 athletes competing in 3 sports: athletics, boxing and swimming.

== Athletics ==
=== Boys ===
Field Events

| Athletes | Event | Qualification | | Final | |
| Athletes | Event | Result | Rank | Result | Rank |
|---|---|---|---|---|---|
| Lindon Kellon Toussaint | Boys’ Discus Throw | 51.61 | 13 qB | 50.93 | 13 |

=== Girls ===
Track and Road Events

| Athletes | Event | Qualification | | Final | |
| Athletes | Event | Result | Rank | Result | Rank |
|---|---|---|---|---|---|
| Lucy Nasha Fortune | Girls’ 200m | 25.04 | 10 qB | 24.63 | 10 |
| Nickhelia Eudora Atida John | Girls’ 400m | 59.97 | 18 qC | 57.31 | 16 |

== Boxing ==
Boys

| Athlete | Event | Preliminaries | Semifinals | Final | Rank |
|---|---|---|---|---|---|
| Kandel Dowden | Flyweight (51kg) | | Dj Maaki (NRU); L 5-5+ | 3rd Place Bout; Hesham Abdelaal (EGY); L DSQ R2 2:35 | 4 |

== Swimming ==
| Athletes | Event | Heat | | Semifinal | | Final | |
| Athletes | Event | Time | Position | Time | Position | Time | Position |
|---|---|---|---|---|---|---|---|
| Richard Francis Regis | Boys’ 50m Freestyle | 27.39 | 40 | Did not advance | | | |
| Richard Francis Regis | Boys’ 100m Freestyle | 1:02.69 | 52 | Did not advance | | | |
| Ayesha Marie Noel | Girls’ 50m Freestyle | 30.96 | 48 | Did not advance | | | |
| Ayesha Marie Noel | Girls’ 200m Backstroke | 2:42.60 | 32 | | | Did not advance | |
