= Guinea at the 2010 Summer Youth Olympics =

- IOC code: GUI
- NOC: Comité National Olympique et Sportif Guinéen

in Singapore
- Competitors: 3 in 3 sports
- Flag bearer: Aminata Souare
- Medals: Gold 0 Silver 0 Bronze 0 Total 0

Summer Youth Olympics appearances
- 2010; 2014; 2018; 2026

Guinea participated in the 2010 Summer Youth Olympics in Singapore.

The Guinean team consisted of 3 athletes competing in 3 sports: athletics, swimming and wrestling.

== Athletics ==
=== Boys ===
Track and road events

Athletes	Event	Qualification		Final	
Athletes	Event	Result	Rank	Result	Rank
Oumar Diallo	Boys' 100m	12.01	29 qD	11.62	25

== Swimming ==
Athletes	Event	Heat		Semifinal		Final	
Athletes	Event	Time	Position	Time	Position	Time	Position
Mohamed Camara	Boys’ 50m Breaststroke	35.56	15 Q	35.17	14	Did not advance	

== Wrestling ==
Freestyle

Athlete	Event	Pools		Final	Rank
Athlete	Event	Groups	Rank	Final	Rank
Aminata Souare	Girls' 60kg	Ford (NZL); L Fall (0–4)	5	9th Place Match; BYE	9
Aminata Souare	Girls' 60kg	Victor (NGR); L 0–2 (0–5, 0–5)	5	9th Place Match; BYE	9
Aminata Souare	Girls' 60kg	Battsetseg (MGL); L Fall (0–6, 0–3)	5	9th Place Match; BYE	9
Aminata Souare	Girls' 60kg	Lipatova (RUS); L 0–2 (0–6, 0–3)	5	9th Place Match; BYE	9
