= Athletics at the 2010 Summer Youth Olympics – Girls' 200 metres =

Athletics – Girls' 200 metres at the I Summer Youth Olympic Games
- Venue: Bishan Stadium
- Date: August 19–22
- Competitors: 20 from 20 nations

Medalists
1st place, gold medalist(s)		Nkiruka Florence Nwakwe	Nigeria
2nd place, silver medalist(s)		Tynia Gaither	Bahamas
3rd place, bronze medalist(s)		Olivia Ekpone	United States

The girls' 200 metres event at the 2010 Youth Olympic Games was held on 19–22 August 2010 in Bishan Stadium.

== Schedule ==
Date	Time	Round
19 August 2010	11:20	Heats
22 August 2010	10:35	Final

== Results ==
=== Heats ===
Rank	Heat	Lane	Athlete	Time	Notes	Q
1	1	3	Nkiruka Florence Nwakwe (NGR)	23.98		FA
2	2	4	Olivia Ekpone (USA)	24.05		FA
3	3	2	Tynia Gaither (BAH)	24.16		FA
4	2	7	Shericka Jackson (JAM)	24.24		FA
5	2	5	Karin Okolie (BUL)	24.39	PB	FA
6	1	5	Isatu Fofanah (CAN)	24.54	=PB	FA
7	3	4	Anna Bongiorni (ITA)	24.65		FA
8	1	4	Monica Brennan (AUS)	24.69	PB	FA
9	3	3	Ekaterina Rehzhina (RUS)	25.00		FB
10	1	7	Lucy Nasha Fortune (GRN)	25.04		FB
11	3	7	Shavonne Husbands (BAR)	25.08		FB
12	3	5	Coralie Leturgez (FRA)	25.22		FB
13	3	6	Hazel Bowering-Scott (NZL)	25.33		FB
14	2	8	Marie-Michelle Athanase (SEY)	27.10	SB	FB
15	1	6	Binta Jatta (GAM)	27.38		FC
16	2	6	Nenneh Barrie (SLE)	28.15		FC
17	1	2	Aichetou Kone M'Bodj (MTN)	28.86		FC
18	2	2	Thrixeena Akua (NRU)	30.27		FC
19	1	8	Noelyn Kukapi (SOL)	31.49		FC
	2	3	Yaneisi Ribeaux (CUB)	DNF		FC

=== Finals ===
==== Final C ====
wind: +0.5 m/s

Rank	Lane	Athlete	Time	Notes
1	5	Binta Jatta (GAM)	26.45	
2	6	Nenneh Barrie (SLE)	27.92	
3	3	Thrixeena Akua (NRU)	30.08	
	7	Noelyn Kukapi (SOL)	DNS	
	4	Aichetou Kone M'Bodj (MTN)	DNS	
	2	Yaneisi Ribeaux (CUB)	DNS	

==== Final B ====
wind: +0.2 m/s

Rank	Lane	Athlete	Time	Notes
1	4	Shavonne Husbands (BAR)	24.58	PB
2	5	Lucy Nasha Fortune (GRN)	24.63	
3	3	Ekaterina Rehzhina (RUS)	24.70	
4	6	Coralie Leturgez (FRA)	25.05	
5	7	Hazel Bowering-Scott (NZL)	25.35	
6	2	Marie-Michelle Athanase (SEY)	26.44	PB

==== Final A ====
wind: +0.7 m/s

Rank	Lane	Athlete	Time	Notes
1st place, gold medalist(s)	3	Nkiruka Florence Nwakwe (NGR)	23.46	PB
2nd place, silver medalist(s)	6	Tynia Gaither (BAH)	23.68	PB
3rd place, bronze medalist(s)	5	Olivia Ekpone (USA)	23.75	PB
4	4	Shericka Jackson (JAM)	24.08	
5	8	Karin Okolie (BUL)	24.34	PB
6	7	Isatu Fofanah (CAN)	24.42	PB
7	2	Anna Bongiorni (ITA)	24.53	
8	1	Monica Brennan (AUS)	24.83	
