= Athletics at the 2010 Summer Youth Olympics – Girls' medley relay =

Athletics – Girls' medley relay at the I Summer Youth Olympic Games
- Venue: Bishan Stadium
- Date: August 23
- Competitors: 20 from 13 nations
- Teams: 5

Medalists
1st place, gold medalist(s)		Team Americas	Mixed-NOCs
2nd place, silver medalist(s)		Team Africa	Mixed-NOCs
3rd place, bronze medalist(s)		Team Europe	Mixed-NOCs

The girls' medley relay event at the 2010 Youth Olympic Games was held on 23 August 2010 in Bishan Stadium. The competitors were divided in 5 teams, each representing a different continent.

== Schedule ==
Date	Time	Round
23 August 2010	20:40	Final

== Results ==
=== Final ===
Rank	Team	Time
1st place, gold medalist(s)	Americas; Myasia Jacobs (USA); Tynia Gaither (BAH); Rashan Brown (BAH); Robin Reynolds (USA)	2:05.62
2nd place, silver medalist(s)	Africa; Josephine Omaka (NGR); Nkiruka Florence Nwakwe (NGR); Izelle Neuhoff (RSA); Bukola Abogunloko (NGR)	2:06.19
3rd place, bronze medalist(s)	Europe; Annie Tagoe (GBR); Anna Bongiorni (ITA); Sonja Mosler (GER); Bianca Răzor (ROU)	2:07.59
4	Oceania; Michelle Jenneke (AUS); Monica Brennan (AUS); Hazel Bowering-Scott (NZL); Jenny Blundell (AUS)	2:13.96
5	Asia; Wei Liang (SIN); Ching-Hsien Liao (TPE); Marina Zaiko (KAZ); Elina Mikhina (KAZ)	2:15.01
