= Puerto Rico at the 2010 Summer Youth Olympics =

- IOC code: PUR
- NOC: Comité Olímpico de Puerto Rico

in Singapore
- Competitors: 15 in 9 sports
- Flag bearer: Emmanuel Rodríguez Vazquez
- Medals Ranked 50th: Gold 1 Silver 0 Bronze 0 Total 1

Summer Youth Olympics appearances
- 2010; 2014; 2018; 2026

Puerto Rico participated in the 2010 Summer Youth Olympics in Singapore.

The Puerto Rico team consisted of 15 athletes competing in 9 sports: athletics, basketball, boxing, gymnastics, sailing, swimming, table tennis, tennis and triathlon. Puerto Rico left Singapore with its first ever medal won by flyweight (51 kg) boxer and flag bearer Emmanuel Rodríguez, after winning the final round against Nauru's DJ Maaki.

== Medalists ==
| Medal | Name | Sport | Event | Date |
|---|---|---|---|---|
| Gold | Emmanuel Rodríguez | Boxing | Men's Fly 51kg | 25 Aug |

== Athletics ==
=== Girls ===
Track and Road Events

| Athletes | Event | Qualification | | Final | |
| Athletes | Event | Result | Rank | Result | Rank |
|---|---|---|---|---|---|
| Nat Isaac | Girls’ 100m Hurdles | 14.25 | 11 qB | 14.08 | 11 |

Field Events

| Athletes | Event | Qualification | | Final | |
| Athletes | Event | Result | Rank | Result | Rank |
|---|---|---|---|---|---|
| Ashley Arroyo Perez | Girls’ Discus Throw | 38.55 | 13 qB | 39.07 | 12 |
| Daliadiz Ortiz Carrasquillo | Girls’ Javelin Throw | 45.26 | 8 Q | 49.10 | 6 |

== Basketball ==
Boys

| Squad List | Event | Group Stage | | Placement Stage | | | Rank |
| Squad List | Event | Group A | Rank | 9th–16th | 9th–12th | 9th–10th | Rank |
|---|---|---|---|---|---|---|---|
| Angel J. Torres Montaivo; Kristian Medina; Onix L. Collazo Romero (C); Abdiel J. Badillo Martinez | Boys' Basketball | India; W 33–15 | 4 | Egypt; W 29–16 | Turkey; W 30–28 | Philippines; L 23–34 | 10 |
| Angel J. Torres Montaivo; Kristian Medina; Onix L. Collazo Romero (C); Abdiel J. Badillo Martinez | Boys' Basketball | Greece; L 21–23 | 4 | Egypt; W 29–16 | Turkey; W 30–28 | Philippines; L 23–34 | 10 |
| Angel J. Torres Montaivo; Kristian Medina; Onix L. Collazo Romero (C); Abdiel J. Badillo Martinez | Boys' Basketball | New Zealand; L 26–30 | 4 | Egypt; W 29–16 | Turkey; W 30–28 | Philippines; L 23–34 | 10 |
| Angel J. Torres Montaivo; Kristian Medina; Onix L. Collazo Romero (C); Abdiel J. Badillo Martinez | Boys' Basketball | Serbia; L 30–31 | 4 | Egypt; W 29–16 | Turkey; W 30–28 | Philippines; L 23–34 | 10 |

== Boxing ==
Boys

| Athlete | Event | Preliminaries | Semifinals | Final | Rank |
|---|---|---|---|---|---|
| Emmanuel Rodríguez | Flyweight (51kg) | Vasiliy Vetkin (RUS); W 11–4 | Hesham Abdelaal (EGY); W 10–1 | Dj Maaki (NRU); W RSC R3 1:34 | Gold medal |

== Gymnastics ==
=== Artistic Gymnastics ===
Boys

| Athlete | Event | Floor | | Pommel Horse | | Rings | | Vault | | Parallel Bars | | Horizontal Bar | | Total | |
| Athlete | Event | Score | Rank | Score | Rank | Score | Rank | Score | Rank | Score | Rank | Score | Rank | Score | Rank |
|---|---|---|---|---|---|---|---|---|---|---|---|---|---|---|---|
| Ismael Sanabria | Boys' Qualification | 13.750 | 18 | 8.650 | 41 | 12.150 | 34 | 15.200 | 18 | 11.050 | 39 | 13.000 | 25 | 73.800 | 38 |

== Sailing ==
Windsurfing

| Athlete | Event | Race | | | | | | | | | | | Points | Rank |
| Athlete | Event | 1 | 2 | 3 | 4 | 5 | 6 | 7 | 8 | 9 | 10 | M* | Points | Rank |
|---|---|---|---|---|---|---|---|---|---|---|---|---|---|---|
| Alejandro Luis Monllor Pacheco | Boys' Techno 293 | 11 | 13 | 9 | 14 | 10 | 9 | ~~OCS~~ | 13 | 5 | 5 | 7 | 96 | 10 |

== Swimming ==
| Athletes | Event | Heat | | Semifinal | | Final | |
| Athletes | Event | Time | Position | Time | Position | Time | Position |
|---|---|---|---|---|---|---|---|
| Emmanuel Antonio Ramirez Aponte | Boys’ 100m Breaststroke | 1:07.47 | 23 | Did not advance | | | |
| Emmanuel Antonio Ramirez Aponte | Boys’ 200m Breaststroke | 2:29.91 | 18 | | | Did not advance | |
| So Lizar | Girls’ 100m Butterfly | 1:03.90 | 22 | Did not advance | | | |
| So Lizar | Girls’ 200m Butterfly | 2:21.25 | 19 | | | Did not advance | |

== Table tennis ==
Individual

| Athlete | Event | Round 1 | | Round 2 | | Quarterfinals | Semifinals | Final | Rank |
| Athlete | Event | Group Matches | Rank | Group Matches | Rank | Quarterfinals | Semifinals | Final | Rank |
|---|---|---|---|---|---|---|---|---|---|
| Carelyn Cordero | Girls' Singles | Hsing (USA); L 0–3 (8–11, 9–11, 6–11) | 3 qB | Giardi (SMR); W 3–0 (11–7, 11–4, 11–9) | 2 | Did not advance | | | 21 |
| Carelyn Cordero | Girls' Singles | Vithanage (SRI); W 3–2 (8–11, 11–8, 11–4, 8–11, 11–9) | 3 qB | Loveridge (GBR); L 1–3 (11–8, 9–11, 7–11, 13–15) | 2 | Did not advance | | | 21 |
| Carelyn Cordero | Girls' Singles | Ng (HKG); L 1–3 (9–11, 11–8, 7–11, 10–12) | 3 qB | Laid (ALG); L 2–3 (7–11, 11–5, 11–9, 8–11, 9–11) | 2 | Did not advance | | | 21 |

Team

| Athlete | Event | Round 1 | | Round 2 | Quarterfinals | Semifinals | Final | Rank |
| Athlete | Event | Group Matches | Rank | Round 2 | Quarterfinals | Semifinals | Final | Rank |
|---|---|---|---|---|---|---|---|---|
| Pan America 2 Carelyn Cordero (PUR); Pablo Saragovi (ARG) | Mixed Team | Chinese Taipei; Huang (TPE); Hung (TPE); L 0–3 (0–3, 0–3, 0–3) | 3 qB | BYE | Europe 3 Loveridge (GBR); Mutti (ITA); L 1–2 (3–2, 2–3, 1–3) | Did not advance | | 21 |
| Pan America 2 Carelyn Cordero (PUR); Pablo Saragovi (ARG) | Mixed Team | New Zealand; Wu (NZL); Wu (NZL); W 3–0 (3–0, 3–1, 3–1) | 3 qB | BYE | Europe 3 Loveridge (GBR); Mutti (ITA); L 1–2 (3–2, 2–3, 1–3) | Did not advance | | 21 |
| Pan America 2 Carelyn Cordero (PUR); Pablo Saragovi (ARG) | Mixed Team | Croatia; Jeger (CRO); Fucec (CRO); L 0–3 (0–3, 1–3, 0–3) | 3 qB | BYE | Europe 3 Loveridge (GBR); Mutti (ITA); L 1–2 (3–2, 2–3, 1–3) | Did not advance | | 21 |

== Tennis ==
Singles

| Athlete | Event | Round 1 | Round 2 | Quarterfinals | Semifinals | Final | Rank |
|---|---|---|---|---|---|---|---|
| Monica Puig | Girls' Singles | Zheng (CHN); L 0–2 (2–6, 4–6) | Consolation; Gámiz (VEN); L 1–2 (6–3, 3–6, [9–11]) | Did not advance | | | |

Doubles

| Athlete | Event | Round 1 | Quarterfinals | Semifinals | Final | Rank |
|---|---|---|---|---|---|---|
| Monica Puig (PUR); Stefanie Tan (SIN) | Girls' Doubles | Gavrilova (RUS); Putintseva (RUS); L 0–2 (4–6, 5–7) | Did not advance | | | |

== Triathlon ==
Girls

| Triathlete | Event | Swimming | Transit 1 | Cycling | Transit 2 | Running | Total time | Rank |
|---|---|---|---|---|---|---|---|---|
| Cristina Luizzet Betancourt de Leon | Individual | 10:15 | 0:37 | did not finish | | | | |

Mixed

| Athlete | Event | Total Times per Athlete (Swim 250 m, Bike 7 km, Run 1.7 km) | Total Group Time | Rank |
|---|---|---|---|---|
| Wan Qi Clara Wong (SIN); Livio Molinari (ITA); Cristina Luizzet Betancourt de Leon (PUR); Boyd Littleford (ZIM) | Mixed Team Relay; World Team 2 | 22:55; 19:36; 23:40; 21:23 | 1:27:34.96 | 12 |

== See also ==
- Puerto Rico at the 2010 Central American and Caribbean Games
