= Weightlifting at the 2010 Summer Youth Olympics – Girls' 58 kg =

The girls' 58 kg weightlifting event was the third women's event at the weightlifting competition at the 2010 Summer Youth Olympics, with competitors limited to a maximum of 58 kilograms of body mass. The whole competition took place on August 17 at 11:00.

Each lifter performed in both the snatch and clean and jerk lifts, with the final score being the sum of the lifter's best result in each. The athlete received three attempts in each of the two lifts; the score for the lift was the heaviest weight successfully lifted.

== Medalists ==
Gold	Deng Wei; China	242 kg
Silver	Zulfiya Chinshanlo; Kazakhstan	225 kg
Bronze	Racheal Ekoshoria; Nigeria	190 kg

== Results ==
Rank	Name	Group	Body Weight	Snatch (kg)				Clean & Jerk (kg)				Total (kg)
Rank	Name	Group	Body Weight	1	2	3	Res	1	2	3	Res	Total (kg)
1st place, gold medalist(s)	Deng Wei (CHN)	A	57.37	100	105	110	110	125	132	~~137~~	132	242
2nd place, silver medalist(s)	Zulfiya Chinshanlo (KAZ)	A	55.54	90	95	~~97~~	95	120	125	130	130	225
3rd place, bronze medalist(s)	Racheal Ekoshoria (NGR)	A	55.13	~~80~~	80	85	85	105	~~110~~	~~110~~	105	190
4	Veronica Haro (ECU)	A	57.76	73	~~77~~	~~77~~	73	~~93~~	93	~~98~~	93	166
5	Silvana Saldarriaga (PER)	A	57.55	~~65~~	65	~~70~~	65	86	90	93	93	158
6	Myriam Ghekap (CMR)	A	56.49	67	~~70~~	~~70~~	67	85	90	~~92~~	90	157
7	Fatin Atikah Osman (MAS)	A	55.15	~~70~~	70	~~73~~	70	80	~~85~~	~~85~~	80	150
8	Jamie Emma Wee (SIN)	A	57.82	47	~~52~~	52	52	~~60~~	60	63	63	115
9	Louise Lolohea (FIJ)	A	57.11	40	45	~~49~~	45	50	~~57~~	57	57	102
	Amal Mohamed (EGY)	A	56.93	77	81	~~84~~	81	~~97~~	~~97~~	~~97~~	—	—
