= Nigeria at the 2010 Summer Youth Olympics =

- IOC code: NGR
- NOC: Nigeria Olympic Committee Inc.

in Singapore
- Competitors: 13 in 6 sports
- Flag bearer: Abiola Olajide
- Medals Ranked 29th: Gold 2 Silver 0 Bronze 2 Total 4

Summer Youth Olympics appearances (overview)
- 2010; 2014; 2018

Nigeria participated in the 2010 Summer Youth Olympics in Singapore.

== Medalists ==
Medal	Name	Sport	Event	Date
Gold	Josephine Omaka	Athletics	Girls' 100m	21 Aug
Gold	Nkiruka Florence Nwakwe	Athletics	Girls' 200m	22 Aug
Silver	Josephine Omaka; Nkiruka Florence Nwakwe; Bukola Abogunloko	Athletics	Girls' Medley Relay	23 Aug
Bronze	Racheal Ekoshoria	Weightlifting	Youth Women's 58kg	17 Aug
Bronze	Bukola Abogunloko	Athletics	Girls' 400m	21 Aug

== Athletics ==
=== Boys ===
Track and Road Events

Athletes	Event	Qualification		Final	
Athletes	Event	Result	Rank	Result	Rank
Okeudo Jonathan Nmaju	Boys’ 200m	21.94	8 Q	21.52	6
Emmanuel Gyang Gwom	Boys’ 3000m	8:38.45	14 qB	8:32.85	15
Tinashe Samuel Mutanga (ZIM); Okeudo Jonathan Nmaju (NGR); Alphas Kishoyian (KEN); Ruan Greyling (RSA)	Boys’ Medley Relay			1:53.45	4

Field Events

Athletes	Event	Qualification		Final	
Athletes	Event	Result	Rank	Result	Rank
Ifeanyi Augustine Nwoye	Boys’ Shot Put	18.02	12 qB	18.22	12
Abiola Olajide	Boys’ Long Jump	6.78	14 qB	7.03	11

=== Girls ===
Track and Road Events

Athletes	Event	Qualification		Final	
Athletes	Event	Result	Rank	Result	Rank
Josephine Omaka	Girls’ 100m	11.82	4 Q	11.58	Gold medal
Nkiruka Florence Nwakwe	Girls’ 200m	23.98	1 Q	23.46	Gold medal
Bukola Abogunloko	Girls’ 400m	53.06	1 Q	53.47	Bronze medal
Josephine Omaka (NGR); Nkiruka Florence Nwakwe (NGR); Izelle Neuhoff (RSA); Bukola Abogunloko (NGR)	Girls’ Medley Relay			2:06.19	Silver medal

Field Events

Athletes	Event	Qualification		Final	
Athletes	Event	Result	Rank	Result	Rank
Nkechi Leticia Chime	Girls’ Shot Put	13.99	6 Q	14.16	7

== Badminton ==
Girls

Athlete	Event	Group Stage				Knock-Out Stage			
Athlete	Event	Match 1	Match 2	Match 3	Rank	Quarterfinal	Semifinal	Final	Rank
Fatima Azeez	Girls’ Singles	Tunali (TUR) L 0-2 (9-21, 19-21)	Cheah (MAS) L 0-2 (7-21, 10-21)	Ugalde (MEX) L 0-2 (19-21, 14-21)	4	Did not advance			

== Boxing ==
Boys

Athlete	Event	Preliminaries	Semifinals	Final	Rank
Muideen Akanji	Middleweight (75kg)		Juan Carlos Carrillo (COL); L 0-5	3rd Place Bout; Zoltán Harcsa (HUN); L 1-8	4

== Table tennis ==
Individual

Athlete	Event	Round 1		Round 2		Quarterfinals	Semifinals	Final	Rank
Athlete	Event	Group Matches	Rank	Group Matches	Rank	Quarterfinals	Semifinals	Final	Rank
Ojo Onaolapo	Boys' Singles	Wu (NZL); W 3-1 (11-5, 7-11, 11-8, 11-3)	1 Q	Leitgeb (AUT); W 3-0 (11-7, 11-9, 11-3)	2 Q	Niwa (JPN); L 2-4 (11-8, 11-8, 8-11, 9-11, 9-11, 11-13)	Did not advance		5
Ojo Onaolapo	Boys' Singles	Kim (KOR); W 3-0 (11-9, 11-6, 14-12)	1 Q	Soderlund (SWE); L 0-3 (6-11, 7-11, 4-11)	2 Q	Niwa (JPN); L 2-4 (11-8, 11-8, 8-11, 9-11, 9-11, 11-13)	Did not advance		5
Ojo Onaolapo	Boys' Singles	Saragovi (ARG); W 3-1 (5-11, 11-7, 11-4, 11-2)	1 Q	Chew (SIN); W 3-2 (11-9, 8-11, 11-4, 6-11, 11-7)	2 Q	Niwa (JPN); L 2-4 (11-8, 11-8, 8-11, 9-11, 9-11, 11-13)	Did not advance		5

Team

Athlete	Event	Round 1		Round 2	Quarterfinals	Semifinals	Final	Rank
Athlete	Event	Group Matches	Rank	Round 2	Quarterfinals	Semifinals	Final	Rank
Africa 1 Islem Laid (ALG); Ojo Onaolapo (NGR)	Mixed Team	Egypt; Meshref (EGY); Bedair (EGY); L 1-2 (0-3, 2-3, 3-0)	4 qB	Pan American 1 Hsing (USA); Gavilan (PAR); L 0-2 (wd)	Did not advance			25
Africa 1 Islem Laid (ALG); Ojo Onaolapo (NGR)	Mixed Team	Intercontinental 2 Noskova (RUS); Holikov (UZB); L 1-2 (0-3, 3-0, 0-3)	4 qB	Pan American 1 Hsing (USA); Gavilan (PAR); L 0-2 (wd)	Did not advance			25
Africa 1 Islem Laid (ALG); Ojo Onaolapo (NGR)	Mixed Team	Singapore; Li (SIN); Chew (SIN); L 1-2 (0-3, 3-1, 0-3)	4 qB	Pan American 1 Hsing (USA); Gavilan (PAR); L 0-2 (wd)	Did not advance			25

== Weightlifting ==
Athlete	Event	Snatch	Clean & Jerk	Total	Rank
Rachael Ekoshoria	Girls' 58kg	85	105	190	Bronze medal

== Wrestling ==
Freestyle

Athlete	Event	Pools		Final	Rank
Athlete	Event	Groups	Rank	Final	Rank
Christiana Victor	Girls' 60kg	Ford (NZL); W 2–0 (4–0, 3–0)	3	5th Place Match; Burkert (USA); L 1–2 (0–1, 2–1, 2-2+)	6
Christiana Victor	Girls' 60kg	Battsetseg (MGL); L 0–2 (1–1+, 0–1)	3	5th Place Match; Burkert (USA); L 1–2 (0–1, 2–1, 2-2+)	6
Christiana Victor	Girls' 60kg	Souare (GUI); W 2–0 (5–0, 5–0)	3	5th Place Match; Burkert (USA); L 1–2 (0–1, 2–1, 2-2+)	6
Christiana Victor	Girls' 60kg	Lipatova (RUS); L 0–2 (1–4, 0–4)	3	5th Place Match; Burkert (USA); L 1–2 (0–1, 2–1, 2-2+)	6
