= Wrestling at the 2010 Summer Youth Olympics – Girls' freestyle 60 kg =

The girls' 60 kg tournament in wrestling at the 2010 Summer Youth Olympics was held on August 16 at the International Convention Centre.

The event limited competitors to a maximum of 60 kilograms of body mass. The tournament had two groups where wrestlers compete in a round-robin format. The winners of each group would go on to play for the gold medal, second placers played for the bronze medal while everyone else played for classification depending on where they ranked in the group stage.

== Medalists ==
Gold	Silver	Bronze
Baatarzorigyn Battsetseg; Mongolia	Pooja Dhanda; India	Svetlana Lipatova; Russia

== Group stages ==
=== Group A ===
Athlete	Pld	C. Points	T. Points
Pooja Dhanda (IND)	3	10	17
Dzhanan Ahmed (BUL)	3	6	8
Jenna Rose Burkert (USA)	3	4	4
Erna Natasha Puteri (SIN)	3	0	0

Jenna Rose Burkert (USA)	0-2 (0-1, 0-1)	Pooja Dhanda (IND)
Dzhanan Ahmed (BUL)	2-0 (4–0, 1–0)	Erna Natasha Puteri (SIN)
Jenna Rose Burkert (USA)	0-2 (0-1, 0-2)	Dzhanan Ahmed (BUL)
Pooja Dhanda (IND)	Fall (6–0)	Erna Natasha Puteri (SIN)
Jenna Rose Burkert (USA)	Fall (3–0)	Erna Natasha Puteri (SIN)
Pooja Dhanda (IND)	2-0 (2–0, 7–0)	Dzhanan Ahmed (BUL)

=== Group B ===
Athlete	Pld	C. Points	T. Points
Baatarzorigyn Battsetseg (MGL)	4	13	16
Svetlana Lipatova (RUS)	4	10	27
Christiana Victor (NGR)	4	8	19
Tayla Ford (NZL)	4	4	4
Aminata Souare (GUI)	4	0	0

Tayla Ford (NZL)	0-2 (0-1, 0-2)	Baatarzorigyn Battsetseg (MGL)
Aminata Souare (GUI)	0-2 (0-5, 0-5)	Christiana Victor (NGR)
Tayla Ford (NZL)	0-2 (0-4, 0-4)	Svetlana Lipatova (RUS)
Baatarzorigyn Battsetseg (MGL)	Fall (6–0, 3–0)	Aminata Souare (GUI)
Tayla Ford (NZL)	0-2 (0-4, 0-3)	Christiana Victor (NGR)
Baatarzorigyn Battsetseg (MGL)	2-1 (0-1, 1–0, 1–1)	Svetlana Lipatova (RUS)
Tayla Ford (NZL)	Fall (4–0)	Aminata Souare (GUI)
Christiana Victor (NGR)	0-2 (1-4, 0-4)	Svetlana Lipatova (RUS)
Baatarzorigyn Battsetseg (MGL)	2-0 (1–1, 1–0)	Christiana Victor (NGR)
Aminata Souare (GUI)	0-2 (0-6, 0-3)	Svetlana Lipatova (RUS)

== Classification ==
=== 7th-place match ===
Erna Natasha Puteri (SIN)	0-2 (0-4, 0-4)	Tayla Ford (NZL)

=== 5th-place match ===
Jenna Rose Burkert (USA)	2-1 (1–0, 1-2, 2–2)	Christiana Victor (NGR)

=== Bronze-medal match ===
Dzhanan Ahmed (BUL)	0-2 (0-1, 0-4)	Svetlana Lipatova (RUS)

=== Gold-medal match ===
Pooja Dhanda (IND)	1-2 (1-5, 1–0, 0-3)	Baatarzorigyn Battsetseg (MGL)

== Final rankings ==
Rank	Athlete
Gold medal	Baatarzorigyn Battsetseg (MGL)
Silver medal	Pooja Dhanda (IND)
Bronze medal	Svetlana Lipatova (RUS)
4	Dzhanan Ahmed (BUL)
5	Jenna Rose Burkert (USA)
6	Christiana Victor (NGR)
7	Tayla Ford (NZL)
8	Erna Natasha Puteri (SIN)
9	Aminata Souare (GUI)
