= Sierra Leone at the 2010 Summer Youth Olympics =

- IOC code: SLE
- NOC: National Olympic Committee of Sierra Leone

in Singapore
- Competitors: 3 (1 men, 2 women) in 1 sport
- Flag bearer: Nenneh Barrie
- Medals: Gold 0 Silver 0 Bronze 0 Total 0

Summer Youth Olympics appearances
- 2010; 2014; 2018

Sierra Leone competed at the 2010 Summer Youth Olympics, the inaugural Youth Olympic Games, held in Singapore from 14 August to 26 August 2010. The nation was represented by the National Olympic Committee of Sierra Leone, which sent a total of three athletes to compete in one sport, athletics. The flagbearer at the opening ceremony for the nation was athlete Nenneh Barrie. Sierra Leone's Olympic team was one of the 106 that did not win a single medal at the Games.

== Athletics ==
Athletics was the only sport Sierra Leone participated in. All three athletes did not make it to the medal final, but instead entered the C Finals (non-medal final) to compete with other athletes who similarly did not make the mark.

=== Boys ===
Track and Road Events

Athletes	Event	Qualification		Final	
Athletes	Event	Result	Rank	Result	Rank
Jimmy Thoronka	Boys’ 400m	52.83	20 qC	DSQ	

=== Girls ===
Track and Road Events

Athletes	Event	Qualification		Final	
Athletes	Event	Result	Rank	Result	Rank
Nenneh Barrie	Girls’ 200m	28.15	16 qC	27.92	16
Mariama Kadijatu	Girls’ 400m	1:00.26	19 qC	58.56	18

== See also ==
- Sierra Leone at the Olympics
- Sport in Sierra Leone
