= Abu Bakarr Fofanah =

Sierra Leonean politician

Dr Abu Bakarr Fofanah
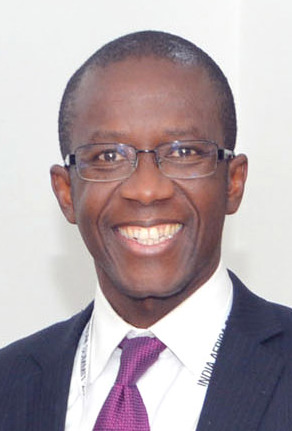
- Fofanah in 2015

Minister of Health and Sanitation
- Incumbent
- Assumed office 2014
- Preceded by: Miatta Kargbo

Abu Bakarr Fofanah is a Sierra Leonean politician who has been minister of health and sanitation in the Cabinet of Sierra Leone since 2014. He was previously a lecturer at the College of Medicine and Allied Health Sciences in Sierra Leone.
