= Mongolia at the 2010 Summer Youth Olympics =

- IOC code: MGL
- NOC: Mongolian National Olympic Committee

in Singapore
- Competitors: 11 in 7 sports
- Flag bearer: Enkhtögsiin Oyunbold
- Medals Ranked 32nd: Gold 2 Silver 0 Bronze 0 Total 2

Summer Youth Olympics appearances
- 2010; 2014; 2018

Mongolia participated in the 2010 Summer Youth Olympics in Singapore.

== Medals ==
Medal	Name	Sport	Event	Date
Gold	Baatarzorigyn Battsetseg	Wrestling	Women's Freestyle 60kg	16 Aug
Gold	Ganbatyn Erdenebold	Gymnastics	Men's Vault	22 Aug
Silver	Otgonbayaryn Dölgöön	Judo	Mixed Team	25 Aug

- Otgonbayaryn Dölgöön won a silver medal as part of a mixed-NOC group. Thus the medal is not counted as won by Mongolia.

== Athletics ==
=== Boys ===
Track and Road Events

Athletes	Event	Qualification		Final	
Athletes	Event	Result	Rank	Result	Rank
Ganboldyn Shijirbaatar	Boys’ 100m	11.57	23 qC	11.66	20

=== Girls ===
Track and Road Events

Athletes	Event	Qualification		Final	
Athletes	Event	Result	Rank	Result	Rank
Khatanbüüvein Michidmaa	Girls’ 400m	1:11.69	24 qD	DSQ	

== Boxing ==
Boys

Athlete	Event	Preliminaries	Semifinals	Final	Rank
Dashdorjiin Anand	Featherweight (57kg)	Elvin Isayev (AZE); L 2-13	Did not advance	5th Place Bout; Jakub Chval (CZE); W 12-6	5

== Gymnastics ==
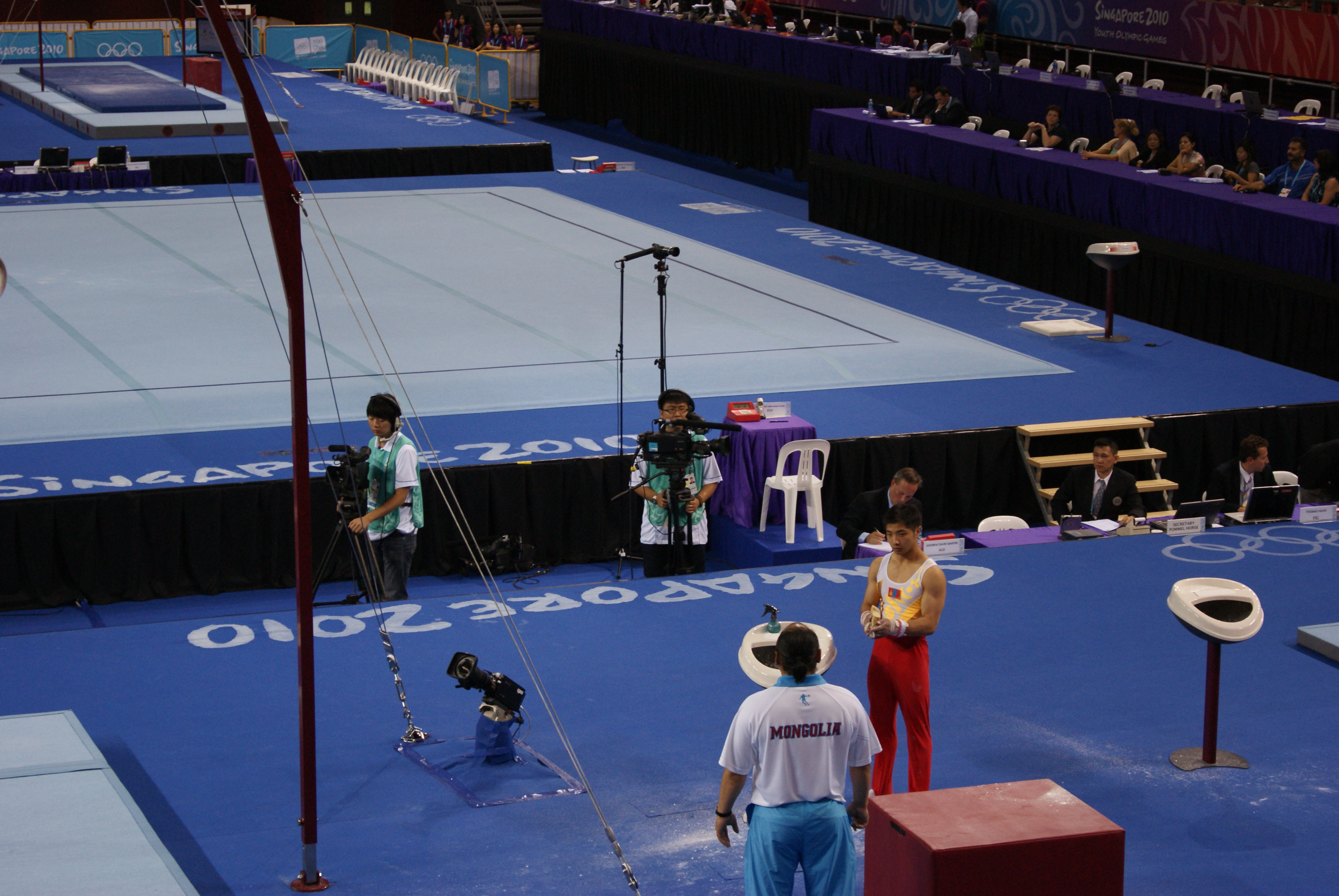
Erdenebold preparing to perform on the rings during the artistic gymnastics competition at Bishan Sports Hall on 16 August 2010

=== Artistic Gymnastics ===
Boys

Athlete	Event	Floor		Pommel Horse		Rings		Vault		Parallel Bars		Horizontal Bar		Total	
Athlete	Event	Score	Rank	Score	Rank	Score	Rank	Score	Rank	Score	Rank	Score	Rank	Score	Rank
Ganbatyn Erdenebold	Boys' Qualification	12.250	39	11.850	30	13.950	8 Q	15.450	13 Q	12.050	33	9.750	41	75.300	37

Athlete	Event	Score	Rank
Ganbatyn Erdenebold	Boys' Rings	13.975	5
Ganbatyn Erdenebold	Boys' Vault	15.662	Gold medal

Girls

Athlete	Event	Vault		Uneven Bars		Beam		Floor		Total	
Athlete	Event	Score	Rank	Score	Rank	Score	Rank	Score	Rank	Score	Rank
Batbaataryn Soyolsaikhan	Girls' Qualification	11.600	42	9.450	37	10.250	39	10.750	38	42.050	37

== Judo ==
Individual

Athlete	Event	Round 1	Round 2	Round 3	Semifinals	Final	Rank
Athlete	Event	Opposition Result	Opposition Result	Opposition Result	Opposition Result	Opposition Result	Rank
Otgonbayaryn Dölgöön	Boys' -66 kg	BYE	Marxer (LIE); W 102-000	Visan (ROU); W 001-000	Hyon (PRK); L 000-100	Bronze Medal Match; Cai (DEN); L 001-100	5

Team

Team	Event	Round 1	Round 2	Semifinals	Final	Rank
Team	Event	Opposition Result	Opposition Result	Opposition Result	Opposition Result	Rank
Belgrade; Anna Dmitrieva (RUS); Jeremy Saywell (MLT); Jennet Geldybayeva (TKM); Babacar Cisse (SEN); Haley Baxter (NZL); Otgonbayaryn Dölgöön (MGL); Lola Mansour (BEL); Marius Piepke (GER)	Mixed Team	BYE	Osaka; W 4-4 (3-1)	Tokyo; W 5-3	Essen; L 1-6	Silver medal

== Swimming ==
Athletes	Event	Heat		Semifinal		Final	
Athletes	Event	Time	Position	Time	Position	Time	Position
Гантулгын Ölziibadrakh	Boys’ 50m Freestyle	26.82	37	Did not advance			
Гантулгын Ölziibadrakh	Boys’ 100m Freestyle	59.35	48	Did not advance			
Erdenebilegiin Sürenyam	Girls’ 50m Butterfly	36.12	23	Did not advance			
Erdenebilegiin Sürenyam	Girls’ 100m Butterfly	DSQ		Did not advance			

== Triathlon ==
Girls

Triathlete	Event	Swimming	Transit 1	Cycling	Transit 2	Running	Total time	Rank
Tüvshinjargalyn Enkhjargal	Individual	10:35	0:38	38:11	0:36	24:22	1:14:22.78	28

Mixed

Athlete	Event	Total Times per Athlete (Swim 250 m, Bike 7 km, Run 1.7 km)	Total Group Time	Rank
Tüvshinjargalyn Enkhjargal (MGL); Kirill Uvarov (KAZ); Mattika Maneekaew (THA); Scott Yiqiang Ang (SIN)	Mixed Team Relay; Asia 3	25:14; 21:02; 25:50; 22:22	1:34:28.69	15

== Wrestling ==
Freestyle

Athlete	Event	Pools		Final	Rank
Athlete	Event	Groups	Rank	Final	Rank
Enkhtögsiin Oyunbold	Boys' 100kg	Magomedabirov (AZE); L 0–2 (0–1, 1–2)	3	5th Place Match; Dhesi (CAN); W 2–1 (1–1+, 2–0, 2-0)	5
Enkhtögsiin Oyunbold	Boys' 100kg	Sualevai (ASA); W Fall (4–0)	3	5th Place Match; Dhesi (CAN); W 2–1 (1–1+, 2–0, 2-0)	5
Enkhtögsiin Oyunbold	Boys' 100kg	Petriachvili (GEO); L 0–2 (1–3, 0–1)	3	5th Place Match; Dhesi (CAN); W 2–1 (1–1+, 2–0, 2-0)	5
Baatarzorigyn Battsetseg	Girls' 60kg	Ford (NZL); W 2–0 (1–0, 2–0)	1	Dhanda (IND); W 2–1 (5–1, 0-1, 3–0)	Gold medal
Baatarzorigyn Battsetseg	Girls' 60kg	Victor (NGR); W 2–0 (1+–1, 1–0)	1	Dhanda (IND); W 2–1 (5–1, 0-1, 3–0)	Gold medal
Baatarzorigyn Battsetseg	Girls' 60kg	Souare (GUI); W Fall (6–0, 3–0)	1	Dhanda (IND); W 2–1 (5–1, 0-1, 3–0)	Gold medal
Baatarzorigyn Battsetseg	Girls' 60kg	Lipatova (RUS); W 2–1 (0-1, 1–0, 1+–1)	1	Dhanda (IND); W 2–1 (5–1, 0-1, 3–0)	Gold medal
