= Daniel Albo =

American surgeon, medical researcher

- Born: 1964
- Education: University of the Republic, Uruguay; Drexel University
- Scientific career
- Institutions: Georgia Regents University; Michael E. DeBakey VA Medical Center

Daniel Albo is an American surgeon, medical researcher, and pioneer in minimally invasive gastrointestinal surgical oncology. He has published in areas including laparoscopic colorectal surgery and surgical oncology. He is the director of surgical oncology services and the director of health services research at the Georgia Regents University Cancer Center.

== Education ==
Dr. Albo earned his medical degree at the University of the Republic, Uruguay in 1991. He completed his General Surgery residency and obtained a PhD degree in Molecular Pathobiology at Drexel University in Philadelphia in 2000. He completed a Surgical Oncology fellowship at the University of Texas MD Anderson Cancer Center in 2002.

== Career ==
Following his fellowship training, Albo joined the Medical College of Georgia in 2002 where he develop a surgical oncology program and a multidisciplinary MD/PhD program in Oncology. He joined the faculty of Baylor College of Medicine in Houston, TX, in 2004. He also served as the chief of general surgery for the Michael E. DeBakey VA Medical Center, where he developed Surgical Oncology and Minimally Invasive surgical services as well as a Colorectal Cancer Center. He was subsequently named vice chairman of the Michael E. DeBakey Department of Surgery of Baylor College of Medicine in 2012. In 2015, he joined Georgia Regents University as professor of surgery. Dr. Albo joined the UTRGV School of Medicine Faculty in March 2021 and currently serves as the Department Chair and Professor in the Department of Surgery.

Albo's clinical expertise is on minimally invasive gastrointestinal surgical oncology, with particular emphasis in colorectal malignancies. His research has focused on utilization patterns, barriers and facilitators for minimally invasive surgery in colorectal surgery. He has helped pioneered the development of a Natural Orifice Trans Endoluminal Surgery (NOTES) technique for resection of rectal tumors, the single port transanal microsurgery (TAMIS) procedure. He has been the President for the Association for Academic Surgery.

== Research interests and contributions ==
Albo's research has focused on translational and health services research in surgical oncology. In the health services research area, he has published outcomes of minimally invasive surgery utilization patterns as well as barriers and facilitators for a widespread adoption of minimally invasive surgery in colorectal disease. He has also studied the impact of minimally invasive surgery on reducing the cost of care in colorectal surgery. His work has also dealt with on issues of health care disparities in surgical oncology, particularly as it affects minorities. In the translational research arena, his work has focused on the mechanisms of tumor invasion and metastases.

His work has resulted in over 100 publications in peer review journals, and, multiple book chapters. He is a co-editor of the Operative Techniques in General Surgery and the editor for the Operative Techniques in Colorectal Surgery textbooks.

== Honors and awards ==
Albo's clinical expertise has resulted in several awards, including the Michael E. DeBakey Distinguished Service Award Medal and a fellowship to American College of Surgeons.
