= Bahamas at the 2010 Summer Youth Olympics =

- IOC code: BAH
- NOC: Bahamas Olympic Association

in Singapore
- Competitors: 11 in 3 sports
- Flag bearer: Rashan Brown
- Medals Ranked 74th: Gold 0 Silver 1 Bronze 0 Total 1

Summer Youth Olympics appearances
- 2010; 2014; 2018

Bahamas participated in the 2010 Summer Youth Olympics in Singapore.

== Medalists ==
Medal	Name	Sport	Event	Date
Gold	Tynia Gaither; Rashan Brown	Athletics	Girls' Medley Relay	23 Aug
Silver	Tynia Gaither	Athletics	Girls' 200m	22 Aug

== Athletics ==
=== Boys ===
Track and Road Events

Athletes	Event	Qualification		Final	
Athletes	Event	Result	Rank	Result	Rank
Julian Munroe	Boys’ 100m	11.13	14 qB	11.04	15
Stephen Newbold	Boys’ 400m Hurdles	54.40	12 qB	53.20	9

Field Events

Athletes	Event	Qualification		Final	
Athletes	Event	Result	Rank	Result	Rank
Lathone Minns	Boys’ Triple Jump	14.66	10 qB	14.86	9
Ryan Ingraham	Boys’ High Jump	2.07	9 qB	2.13	9

=== Girls ===
Track and Road Events

Athletes	Event	Qualification		Final	
Athletes	Event	Result	Rank	Result	Rank
Marva Etienne	Girls’ 100m	12.34	12 qB	DNS	
Tynia Gaither	Girls’ 200m	24.16	3 Q	23.68	Silver medal
Rashan Brown	Girls’ 400m	54.09	4 Q	53.63	4
Myasia Jacobs (USA); Tynia Gaither (BAH); Rashan Brown (BAH); Robin Reynolds (USA)	Girls’ medley relay			2:05.62	Gold medal

Field Events

Athletes	Event	Qualification		Final	
Athletes	Event	Result	Rank	Result	Rank
Raquel Williams	Girls’ Shot Put	11.59	15 qB	11.86	15

== Judo ==
Individual

Athlete	Event	Round 1	Round 2	Round 3	Semifinals	Final	Rank
Athlete	Event	Opposition Result	Opposition Result	Opposition Result	Opposition Result	Opposition Result	Rank
Cynthia Rahming	Girls' -44 kg	BYE	Sam (CAM); L 000-012		Repechage; Valnova (BLR); L 000-100	Did not advance	7

Team

Team	Event	Round 1	Round 2	Semifinals	Final	Rank
Team	Event	Opposition Result	Opposition Result	Opposition Result	Opposition Result	Rank
Hamilton; Cynthia Rahming (BAH); Paolo Persoglia (SMR); Odette Giuffrida (ITA); Davit Ghazaryan (ARM); Wildjie Vertus (HAI); Jae Hyung Lee (KOR); Una Svetlana Tuba (SRB); Anis Shalabi (LBA)	Mixed Team	BYE	Cairo; L 4-4 (2-3)	did not advance		5

== Swimming ==
Athletes	Event	Heat		Semifinal		Final	
Athletes	Event	Time	Position	Time	Position	Time	Position
Armando Moss	Boys’ 50m Freestyle	24.86	26	Did not advance			
Armando Moss	Boys’ 50m Butterfly	26.46	11 Q	26.40	12	Did not advance	
Bria Deveaux	Girls’ 50m Freestyle	28.27	34	Did not advance			
Bria Deveaux	Girls’ 100m Freestyle	1:01.17	42	Did not advance			
