= Athletics at the 2010 Summer Youth Olympics – Girls' 400 metres =

Athletics – Girls' 400 metres at the I Summer Youth Olympic Games
- Venue: Bishan Stadium
- Date: August 17–21
- Competitors: 27 from 27 nations

Medalists
1st place, gold medalist(s)		Robin Reynolds	United States
2nd place, silver medalist(s)		Bianca Răzor	Romania
3rd place, bronze medalist(s)		Bukola Abogunloko	Nigeria

The girls' 400 metres event at the 2010 Youth Olympic Games was held on 17–21 August 2010 in Bishan Stadium.

== Schedule ==
Date	Time	Round
17 August 2010	11:15	Heats
21 August 2010	20:05	Final

== Results ==
=== Heats ===
Rank	Heat	Lane	Athlete	Time	Notes	Q
1	4	3	Bukola Abogunloko (NGR)	53.06		FA
2	1	4	Robin Reynolds (USA)	53.21	SB	FA
3	2	3	Bianca Răzor (ROU)	53.89		FA
4	1	3	Rashan Brown (BAH)	54.09		FA
5	3	5	Katherine Reid (CAN)	54.54		FA
6	3	6	Sonja Mosler (GER)	54.86		FA
7	2	6	Izelle Neuhoff (RSA)	55.01		FA
8	2	5	Olivia James (JAM)	55.05		FA
9	4	4	Romana Tea Kirinic (CRO)	55.08		FB
10	4	6	Victoria Ohuruogu (GBR)	55.56		FB
11	4	2	Frederique Hansen (LUX)	56.34		FB
12	3	4	Katarina Ilic (SRB)	56.41		FB
13	1	6	Yaneth Largacha (COL)	57.44		FB
14	3	3	Kemesha Spann (TRI)	57.57		FB
15	4	5	Tsiatengy Razafindrakoto (MAD)	57.94		FB
16	2	4	Elina Mikhina (KAZ)	58.76		FC
17	2	8	Tabique Lockhart (DMA)	58.76		FC
18	1	5	Nickhelia Eudora Atida John (GRN)	59.97		FC
19	3	8	Mariama Kadijatu Conteh (SLE)	1:00.26		FC
20	2	2	Loth Toni (BEN)	1:01.89		FC
21	3	7	Wendy Enn (SIN)	1:02.74		FC
22	4	7	Manisha Adhikari (NEP)	1:03.49		FD
23	3	2	Jenili Hilario Rodrigues (AND)	1:06.91		FD
24	1	2	Michidmaa Khatanbuuvei (MGL)	1:11.69		FD
25	1	8	Reloliza Saimon (FSM)	1:12.41		FD
	2	7	Hani Abdirahman Muse (SOM)	DNF		FD
	1	7	Halima Nakayi (UGA)	DSQ		FD

=== Finals ===
==== Final D ====
Rank	Lane	Athlete	Time	Notes
1	4	Jenili Hilario Rodrigues (AND)	1:06.63	
2	3	Reloliza Saimon (FSM)	1:07.12	PB
	6	Michidmaa Khatanbuuvei (MGL)	DSQ	
	2	Halima Nakayi (UGA)	DSQ	
	7	Hani Abdirahman Muse (SOM)	DNS	
	5	Manisha Adhikari (NEP)	DNS	

=== Final C ===
Rank	Lane	Athlete	Time	Notes
1	6	Nickhelia Eudora Atida John (GRN)	57.31	
2	4	Elina Mikhina (KAZ)	58.11	
3	5	Mariama Kadijatu Conteh (SLE)	58.56	
4	3	Tabique Lockhart (DMA)	59.44	
5	2	Wendy Enn (SIN)	1:02.43	
	7	Loth Toni (BEN)	DSQ	

==== Final B ====
Rank	Lane	Athlete	Time	Notes
1	5	Romana Tea Kirinic (CRO)	55.59	
2	4	Katarina Ilic (SRB)	55.77	
3	3	Victoria Ohuruogu (GBR)	55.99	
4	6	Frederique Hansen (LUX)	56.35	
5	8	Yaneth Largacha (COL)	56.43	
6	7	Kemesha Spann (TRI)	57.07	
7	2	Tsiatengy Razafindrakoto (MAD)	58.53	

==== Final A ====
Rank	Lane	Athlete	Time	Notes
1st place, gold medalist(s)	6	Robin Reynolds (USA)	52.57	SB
2nd place, silver medalist(s)	4	Bianca Răzor (ROU)	53.10	
3rd place, bronze medalist(s)	3	Bukola Abogunloko (NGR)	53.47	
4	5	Rashan Brown (BAH)	53.63	PB
5	7	Katherine Reid (CAN)	53.69	
6	2	Olivia James (JAM)	54.14	
7	8	Sonja Mosler (GER)	55.20	
8	1	Izelle Neuhoff (RSA)	56.27	
