= Racheal Ekoshoria =

Nigerian Paralympic athlete

Personal information
- Full name: Racheal Ekoshoria
- Born: 30 August 1994 (age 31) Nigeria

Sport
- Country: Nigeria
- Sport: Weightlifting
- Event: +75kg
Medal record
Women's Weightlifting
Representing Nigeria
African Weightlifting Championships
Bronze medal – third place	2016 Yaoundé	+ 75 kg
2010 Summer Youth Olympics
Bronze medal – third place	2010 Singapore	+ 75 kg

Racheal Ekoshoria is a weightlifting athlete from Nigeria. She competes in the women's 58 kg class.

== Career ==
Racheal competed at the 2010 Summer Youth Olympic Games in Singapore in under 58 kg event and won a bronze medal. At the 2016 African Weightlifting Championships in Yaoundé, Cameroon, she won silver in less than 58 kg with a result of 192 kg.

== See also ==
- Weightlifting at the 2010 Summer Youth Olympics
- Nigeria at the 2010 Summer Youth Olympics
