= Thrixeena Akua =

Nauruan sprinter (born 1994)

Thrixeena Akua (born March 4, 1994) is a Nauruan sprinter. During the 2011 Commonwealth Youth Games, she landed in seventh place in the 100m women event. She also competed in the Summer Youth Olympic Games in Singapore.

== Olympic games ==
In 2010, she took part in the Summer Youth Olympic Games in Singapore. On 19 August she took part in the 200 m qualifying race, where she finished in sixth place with a time of 30.27 (one runner, Yaneisi Ribeaux, did not finish the race). This result allowed her to start in the Final C, where she improved the elimination time by running the distance in 30.08 s and taking third place (it was, however, the last time of the final, because as many as three players - Noelyn Kukapi, Aichetou Mbodj, Yaneisi Ribeaux - were disqualified). In the overall classification she took 17th place. This result allowed her to start in the Final C, where she improved the elimination time by running the distance in 30.08 s and taking third place. In the overall classification she took 17th place.

She competed twice (100 m and 200 m run) in athletics competitions during the 2011 Youth Commonwealth Games. The first distance in which she started was 100 metres. In the qualifying rounds, which took place on 9 September, this distance ran in 14.18 s, which gave her the penultimate, seventh place. Sophie Papps lost 2.03 s to the race winner; poor result did not allow her to advance to the next stage of the competition. A day later she took off at twice the distance. In her elimination run, she obtained the last, fifth time - 29.61 s - losing to the winner Caroline Morin-Houde over 5 seconds (24.40 s). This did not allow her to continue competing on this distance.
