= Athletics at the 2010 Summer Youth Olympics – Girls' shot put =

Athletics – Girls' shot put at the I Summer Youth Olympic Games
- Venue: Bishan Stadium
- Date: August 18–22
- Competitors: 15 from 15 nations

Medalists
1st place, gold medalist(s)		Natalia Troneva	Russia
2nd place, silver medalist(s)		Gu Siyu	China
3rd place, bronze medalist(s)		Anna Wloka	Poland

The girls' shot put event at the 2010 Youth Olympic Games was held on 18–22 August 2010 in Bishan Stadium in Singapore.

== Schedule ==
Date	Time	Round
18 August 2010	09:05	Qualification
22 August 2010	09:05	Final

== Results ==
=== Qualification ===
Rank	Athlete	1	2	3	4	Result	Notes	Q
1	Anna Wloka (POL)	15.02	15.70	15.77	x	15.77	PB	FA
2	Gu Siyu (CHN)	15.22	15.71	x	x	15.71		FA
3	Natalia Troneva (RUS)	13.82	15.06	14.50	14.47	15.06		FA
4	Laura Gedminaite (LTU)	14.83	x	14.41	x	14.83	PB	FA
5	Sophie McKinna (GBR)	14.30	14.04	13.94	x	14.30		FA
6	Nkechi Leticia Chime (NGR)	13.99	13.49	13.22	13.92	13.99		FA
7	Sarah Howard (USA)	x	x	13.87	x	13.87		FA
8	Viktoryia Kolb (BLR)	13.39	13.61	13.43	13.22	13.61		FA
9	Lai Li-chun (TPE)	12.00	12.50	13.01	13.57	13.57	PB	FB
10	Prabhjot Rai (AUS)	12.78	12.96	13.56	13.43	13.56		FB
11	Katinka Urbaniak (GER)	13.03	x	13.44	13.41	13.44		FB
12	Shoko Matsuda (JPN)	13.08	12.64	13.02	13.06	13.08		FB
13	Rayann Chin (CAN)	11.83	11.72	12.06	x	12.06		FB
14	Saionara Pavanatto (BRA)	11.90	x	x	11.02	11.90		FB
15	Raquel Williams (BAH)	x	11.49	x	11.59	11.59		FB

=== Finals ===
==== Final B ====
Rank	Athlete	1	2	3	4	Result	Notes
1	Katinka Urbaniak (GER)	13.49	13.89	13.68	14.15	14.15	
2	Shoko Matsuda (JPN)	13.33	13.51	x	13.53	13.53	
3	Lai Li-chun (TPE)	x	13.24	13.18	13.40	13.40	
4	Prabhjot Rai (AUS)	13.23	13.19	x	13.30	13.30	
5	Rayann Chin (CAN)	11.74	12.64	12.29	x	12.64	
6	Saionara Pavanatto (BRA)	11.92	11.75	x	11.77	11.92	
7	Raquel Williams (BAH)	11.15	11.79	11.86	x	11.86	

==== Final A ====
Rank	Athlete	1	2	3	4	Result	Notes
1st place, gold medalist(s)	Natalia Troneva (RUS)	14.17	14.21	14.50	15.66	15.66	PB
2nd place, silver medalist(s)	Gu Siyu (CHN)	x	14.68	x	15.49	15.49	
3rd place, bronze medalist(s)	Anna Wloka (POL)	14.42	15.48	x	15.13	15.48	
4	Laura Gedminaite (LTU)	14.76	15.15	14.96	14.69	15.15	PB
5	Sophie McKinna (GBR)	14.07	13.47	15.14	14.73	15.14	PB
6	Viktoryia Kolb (BLR)	13.91	13.85	14.61	x	14.61	PB
7	Nkechi Leticia Chime (NGR)	13.64	13.00	13.04	14.16	14.16	PB
8	Sarah Howard (USA)	13.06	x	13.44	x	13.44	
