= Isatu Fofanah (politician) =

Sierra Leonean politician

Deputy Mayor of Makeni
- In office 2012–present

Personal details
- Born: March 13, 1958 (age 68) Bombali District, British Sierra Leone
- Party: All People's Congress (APC)

Isatu Fofanah (born March 13, 1958) is a Sierra Leonean politician. She is currently serving as the deputy mayor of Makeni, the largest city in Northern Sierra Leone. She is an elected councilor in the Makeni city Council and a member of the All People's Congress political party, the ruling party in Sierra Leone.
