= Isatu Fofanah (athlete) =

Canadian sprinter

Personal information
- Born: 13 April 1993 (age 33) Sierra Leone
- Education: Northern Arizona University; Colorado State University

Sport
- Country: Canada
- Sport: Track and field
- Event(s): 100 m, 200 m
- College team: Colorado State Rams

Isatu Fofanah (born 13 April 1993) is a Canadian sprinter. She competed in the 4 × 100 metres relay at the 2015 World Championships in Beijing finishing sixth in the final.

== Early life and education ==
Isatu Fofanah was born in Sierra Leone and later moved to Canada, where she developed her athletics career. She attended Northern Arizona University before transferring to Colorado State University, where she competed for the Colorado State Rams track and field team. During her collegiate career, she competed in sprint events including the 100 metres and 200 metres, representing the university in several NCAA competitions.

== Career ==
Fofanah competed internationally for Canada in sprint events. She represented the country at the 2010 Summer Youth Olympics in Singapore, where she finished sixth in the 200 metres event.

She later competed at the 2012 World Junior Championships in Athletics in Barcelona. In 2015, she was part of the Canadian team that competed in the women's 4 × 100 metres relay at the 2015 World Championships in Athletics in Beijing, where the team finished sixth in the final.

== International competitions ==
Year	Competition	Venue	Position	Event	Notes
Representing Canada
2010	Youth Olympic Games	Singapore	6th	200 m	24.42
2012	World Junior Championships	Barcelona, Spain	38th (h)	200 m	24.78
2012	World Junior Championships	Barcelona, Spain	–	4 × 100 m relay	DQ
2015	World Championships	Beijing, China	6th	4 × 100 m relay	43.05

== Personal bests ==
Outdoor

- 100 metres – 11.46 (+1.5 m/s, Edmonton 2015)
- 200 metres – 23.72 (+1.1 m/s, El Paso 2015)

Indoor

- 60 metres – 7.36 (Flagstaff 2013)
- 200 metres – 24.13 (Birmingham, AL 2015)
