= Annie Tagoe =

British athlete

Personal information
- Nationality: Great Britain
- Born: 4 June 1993 (age 33)

Sport
- Sport: Athletics
- Event: Sprint

Achievements and titles
- Personal bests: 100m: 11.43 (Manchester, 2023); 200m: 24.05 (Houston, 2023)
Medal record
Women's athletics
Representing Great Britain
World Championships
Bronze medal – third place	2023 Budapest	4×100 m relay
European U23 Championships
Silver medal – second place	2013 Tampere	4×100 m relay
European Junior Championships
Bronze medal – third place	2011 Tallinn	4×100 m relay
Summer Youth Olympics
Bronze medal – third place	2010 Singapore	Medley relay

Annie Tagoe (born 4 June 1993) is a British track and field athlete who competes as a sprinter.

== Early and personal life ==
Tagoe was born in Ghana and brought up in Willesden in north-west London from the age of six. Her mother is an NHS Nurse. She played for QPR Girls football team as a youngster. She was excluded from school 32 times before being introduced to the charity Track Academy, set up using money from Comic Relief. She became the England Under-17 100 metres champion, she attended Royal Central School of Speech and Drama at 18 years-old, and graduated after three years. She has also worked as a model but has spoken about racism she experienced that caused her to contemplate trying to bleach her skin lighter.

In 2010, Tagoe worked with MP Dawn Butler and musician Chipmunk on a project to help young people associate with politics.

== Career ==
Tagoe represented Britain at the 2010 Summer Youth Olympics in Singapore. She won a bronze medal in the medley relay event.

She won the Outstanding Achievement Award at the UK Athletics Awards in 2009.

In 2011, she was selected for the Britain squad for the 2011 European Athletics U20 Championships in Tallinn, as part of the 4 × 100 m relay squad with Jennie Batten, Mica Moore and Bianca Williams.

Tagoe won a European Athletics U23 Championships silver medal for Britain in the 4 × 100 m relay alongside team-mates Corinne Humphreys, Jodie Williams, and Rachel Johncock in Tampere, Finland in 2013.

Tagoe suffered injuries that required surgery on both knees in 2014 and 2015 and prohibited her from running for a number of years. She also has arthritis in her ankle which can cause discomfort in cold conditions. Between 2020 and 2022 she only raced 17 times and moved to Houston, Texas to train under Coach Anderson.

Competing at the UK Athletics Championships in Manchester in July 2023, Tagoe was one of the fastest qualifiers for the final of the women's 100m race, behind Dina Asher-Smith. She was chosen to represent Great Britain at the 2023 World Athletics Championships in Budapest in August 2023.

In April 2024, she was selected as part of the British team for the 2024 World Athletics Relays in Nassau, Bahamas.
