= Bukola Abogunloko =

Nigerian sprinter (born 1994)

Personal information
- Born: 18 August 1994 (age 31) Ijero, Nigeria
- Height: 1.70 m (5 ft 7 in)
- Weight: 53 kg (117 lb)

Sport
- Country: Nigeria
- Sport: Athletics
- Event: 4 × 400m Relay
Medal record
Women's athletics
Representing Nigeria
African Championships
Gold medal – first place	2010 Nairobi	4×400 m
Gold medal – first place	2012 Porto-Novo	4×400 m
Summer Youth Olympics
Silver medal – second place	2010 Singapore	Medley relay
Bronze medal – third place	2010 Singapore	400 m

Bukola Dammy Abogunloko (born 18 August 1994) is a Nigerian sprinter. She was part of the Nigerian 4 × 400 metres relay team at the 2012 Olympics that made it to the final. However, they were disqualified in the finals.
