= Baatarzorigiin Battsetseg =

Mongolian wrestler

Medal record

Representing Mongolia

Women's wrestling

Youth Olympic Games
Gold medal – first place	2010 Singapore	60 kg

Baatarzorigiin Battsetseg (Mongolian: Баатарзоригийн Батцэцэг) is a Mongolian wrestler who participated at the 2010 Summer Youth Olympics in Singapore. She won the gold medal in the girls' freestyle 60 kg event, defeating Pooja Dhanda of India in the final.
