= Tynia Gaither =

Bahamian sprinter

Personal information
- Born: 16 March 1993 (age 33) Freeport, Bahamas
- Education: University of Southern California
- Height: 1.58 m (5 ft 2 in)

Sport
- Country: Bahamas
- Sport: Athletics
- Events: 100 m, 200 m
- College team: USC Trojans
Medal record
Representing the Bahamas
Pan American Games
Bronze medal – third place	2019 Lima	200 m
NACAC Championships
Silver medal – second place	2022 Freeport	200 metres
Silver medal – second place	2022 Freeport	4x100 m relay

Tynia Gaither (born 16 March 1993) is a Bahamian athlete competing in sprinting events. Gaither has represented the Bahamas at the 2016 and 2020 Summer Olympics.

== Career ==
She won the silver medal in the 200 metres at the 2010 Summer Youth Olympics. She later represented her country in the 60 metres at the 2016 World Indoor Championships without advancing from the first round.

She competed at the 2019 Pan American Games, winning a bronze medal.

== Competition record ==
Year	Competition	Venue	Position	Event	Notes
Representing the Bahamas
2010	CARIFTA Games	George Town, Cayman Islands	2nd	200 m	23.83
2010	CARIFTA Games	George Town, Cayman Islands	2nd	4 × 100 m relay	45.59
2010	World Junior Championships	Moncton, Canada	23rd (sf)	200 m	24.48
2010	Youth Olympic Games	Singapore	2nd	200 m	23.68
2011	CARIFTA Games	Montego Bay, Jamaica	5th	100 m	11.72
2016	World Indoor Championships	Portland, United States	28th (h)	60 m	7.41
2016	Olympic Games	Rio de Janeiro, Brazil	39th (h)	100 m	11.56
2016	Olympic Games	Rio de Janeiro, Brazil	24th (sf)	200 m	23.45
2017	IAAF World Relays	Nassau, Bahamas	6th	4 × 100 m relay	44.01
2017	World Championships	London, United Kingdom	8th	200 m	23.07
2017	World Championships	London, United Kingdom	–	4 × 100 m relay	DNF
2018	NACAC Championships	Toronto, Canada	6th	200 m	23.41
2019	Pan American Games	Lima, Peru	3rd	200 m	22.76
2019	Pan American Games	Lima, Peru	–	4 × 100 m relay	DNF
2019	World Championships	Doha, Qatar	13th (sf)	100 m	11.20
2019	World Championships	Doha, Qatar	8th	200 m	22.90
2021	Olympic Games	Tokyo, Japan	21st (sf)	100 m	11.31
2022	World Championships	Eugene, United States	18th (h)	100 m	11.16^{1}
2022	World Championships	Eugene, United States	11th (sf)	200 m	22.41
2022	NACAC Championships	Freeport, Bahamas	2nd	200 m	22.41
2022	NACAC Championships	Freeport, Bahamas	2nd	4 × 100 m relay	43.34

^{1} Disqualified in the semifinals

== Personal bests ==
Outdoor

- 100 metres – 11.02 (+1.3 m/s, Miami 2021)
- 200 metres – 22.41 (+2.0 m/s, Eugene 2022)

Indoor

- 60 metres – 7.23 (Seattle 2015)
- 200 metres – 23.11 (Fayetteville 2016)
