= Hesham Yehia =

Egyptian boxer (born 1993)

Hesham Abdelaal (born 5 September 1993, in Dakahlia Governorate) is an Egyptian boxer. At the 2012 Summer Olympics, he competed in the Men's flyweight, but was defeated in the first round.
