= Dj Maaki =

Nauruan boxer

Dj Maaki (born December 15, 1992), is Nauruan boxer. During the 2010 Summer Youth Olympics, he lost to Puerto Rican Emmanuelle Rodriguez, but won a silver medal.
