= Palau at the 2026 Summer Youth Olympics =

- Flag of Palau
- IOC code: PLW
- NOC: Palau National Olympic Committee

in Dakar, Senegal October 31, 2026 – November 13, 2026
- Competitors: 6 in 5 sports
- Flag bearer: Kazuumi Nestor
- Medals: Gold 0 Silver 0 Bronze 0 Total 0

Summer Youth Olympics appearances
- 2010; 2014; 2018; 2026

Palau is scheduled to compete at the 2026 Summer Youth Olympics in Dakar, Senegal from October 31 to November 13, 2026. This will mark Palau's fourth appearance at the Youth Olympics, after making its debut in 2010.

Swimmer Kazuumi Nestor served as the flag bearer for the opening ceremony.

== Competitors ==
The following is the list of number of competitors participating at the Games per sport/discipline.

Sport	Men	Women	Total
Athletics	1	0	1
Beach volleyball	2	0	2
Beach wrestling	1	0	1
Swimming	1	0	1
Triathlon	0	1	1
Total	5	1	6

== Athletics ==
Palau entered one male athlete.

Track events

Athlete	Event	Heat		Final	
Athlete	Event	Result	Rank	Result	Rank
Zane Ililau	Men's 100 metres				

== Beach volleyball ==
Palau received a quota place for the men's tournament.

Summary

Team	Event	Group stage				Round of 16	Quarterfinals	Semifinals	Final / PG / BM	
Team	Event	Opposition Result	Opposition Result	Opposition Result	Rank	Opposition Result	Opposition Result	Opposition Result	Opposition Result	Rank
Linzy Allen; Brendan Keane	Men's tournament	Sibide / Ciss (SEN)	Eser / Foks (TUR)	Tjernqvist / Brus (SWE)						

== Beach wrestling ==
Palau entered one male athlete.

Athlete	Event	Group Stage				Semifinal	Final / BM	
Athlete	Event	Opposition Result	Opposition Result	Opposition Result	Rank	Opposition Result	Opposition Result	Rank
Vicente Mettao	Men's –80 kg							

== Swimming ==
Palau entered one male swimmer.

Athlete	Event	Heat		Final	
Athlete	Event	Time	Rank	Time	Rank
Kazuumi Nestor	Men's 50 m freestyle				
Kazuumi Nestor	Men's 50 m backstroke				
Kazuumi Nestor	Men's 100 m backstroke				

== Triathlon ==
Palau qualified one female athlete.

Athlete	Event	Time						Rank
Athlete	Event	Swim (750 km)	Trans 1	Bike (20 km)	Trans 2	Run (5 km)	Total	Rank
Elengoi Gibbons	Women's							
