= Gift Bright =

Nigerian sprinter (born 2010)

Personal information
- Nationality: Nigeria
- Born: 20 December 2010 (age 15)
- Home town: Delta State

Sport
- Sport: Athletics
- Events: 100 metres, 200 metres

Achievements and titles
- Personal bests: 100 m: 10.28 (2026); 200 m: 20.72 (2026)
Medal record
Men's athletics
Representing Nigeria
Youth Olympic Games
Gold medal – first place	2026 Dakar	100 m

Gift Bright (born 20 December 2010) is a Nigerian sprinter. He won a gold medal at the 2026 Summer Youth Olympics.

== Career ==
Bright was discovered by an athletics coach during a school relay at his secondary school in Asaba, Nigeria where he was a barefoot runner. He competed at the 2024 National Youth Games and won a gold medal in the 200 metres for Delta State.

In November 2026, he represented Nigeria at the 2026 Summer Youth Olympics and won a gold medal in the 100 metres with a Youth Olympic Games record time of 10.28 seconds. At 15 years old, he was the youngest athlete in the 100 metres race. Rosemary Nwankwo won the women's 100 metres. Nigeria became the first country to win both 100-metre races at the same edition of the Summer Youth Olympics.
