= Eswatini at the 2026 Summer Youth Olympics =

- Flag of Eswatini
- IOC code: SWZ
- NOC: Eswatini Olympic and Commonwealth Games Association
- Website: www.socga.org.sz

in Dakar, Senegal October 31, 2026 – November 13, 2026
- Competitors: 3 in 3 sports
- Flag bearer: Luca Fraser
- Medals: Gold 0 Silver 0 Bronze 0 Total 0

Summer Youth Olympics appearances
- 2010; 2014; 2018; 2026

Eswatini is scheduled to compete at the 2026 Summer Youth Olympics in Dakar, Senegal from October 31 to November 13, 2026. This will mark Eswatini's fourth appearance at the Youth Olympics, after making its debut in 2010.

Swimmer Luca Fraser served as the flag bearer for the opening ceremony.

== Competitors ==
The following is the list of number of competitors participating at the Games per sport/discipline.

Sport	Men	Women	Total
Athletics	1	0	1
Swimming	1	0	1
Taekwondo	0	1	1
Total	2	1	3

== Athletics ==
Eswatini entered one male athlete.

=== Track & road events ===
Men

Athlete	Event	Heat		Semifinal		Final	
Athlete	Event	Result	Rank	Result	Rank	Result	Rank
Mvuselelo Mkhwanazi	100 m						

== Swimming ==
Eswatini entered one male swimmer.

Athlete	Event	Heat		Final	
Athlete	Event	Time	Rank	Time	Rank
Luca Fraser	50 m breaststroke				
Luca Fraser	100 m breaststroke				
Luca Fraser	200 m breaststroke				

== Taekwondo ==
Eswatini entered one female athlete.

Women

Athlete	Event	Round of 16	Quarterfinals	Semifinals	Repechage	Final / BM	
Athlete	Event	Opposition Result	Opposition Result	Opposition Result	Opposition Result	Opposition Result	Rank
Simisile Thwala	-55 kg	Bye					
