= Triathlon at the 2026 Summer Youth Olympics – Women's =

Women's individual at the IV Summer Youth Olympic Games
- Venue: Saly Beach West
- Date: 6 November
- Competitors: 32 from 32 nations

Medalists
1st place, gold medalist(s)		Kimey Casanova	Switzerland
2nd place, silver medalist(s)		Jazmin Kropko	Hungary
3rd place, bronze medalist(s)		Evamaria Albert	Estonia

These are the results for the women's individual event at the 2026 Summer Youth Olympics.

== Format ==
The event is a continuous competition with no breaks, consisting of 32 athletes. A draw is held at least 24 hours prior to the race to randomly assign start positions, and the first athlete to cross the finish line is declared the winner.

Unlike the 2018 Games, there is no Mixed Relay team event on the programme. The women's individual competition follows a sprint distance format:

Event	Swim	Bike	Run	Total Est. Time
Women's Individual	750m (1 lap)	20.0km (3 laps)	5.0km (3 laps)	~1 hour 10 mins

=== Rules and Procedures ===
- Tie-Breaks: If a photo finish cannot discern a winner, the tie stands and athletes share the position, with the lowest race number listed first.
- Penalties: Violations of World Triathlon rules (e.g., early starts, course shortcuts, or improper transition line mounts) result in warnings, time penalties, or disqualification.
- Appeals: Protests must be announced within 5 minutes and filed in writing within 15 minutes of the official results posting.

== Results ==
Rank	Triathlete	Nation	Swimming	Transit 1	Cycling	Transit 2	Running	Total time	Difference
1st place, gold medalist(s)	Kimey Casanova	Switzerland	9:41	0:23	30:23	0:25	18:06	58:58	+0:00
2nd place, silver medalist(s)	Jazmin Kropko	Hungary	9:27	0:22	30:36	0:23	18:31	59:19	+0:21
3rd place, bronze medalist(s)	Evamaria Albert	Estonia	9:47	0:21	30:18	0:25	18:46	59:37	+0:39
4	Maria Romero Lopez	Spain	9:48	0:27	30:12	0:23	18:57	59:47	+0:49
5	Taylor Foster	South Africa	9:29	0:22	30:37	0:27	19:39	1:00:34	+1:36
6	Piper Anderson	Australia	9:37	0:24	30:27	0:28	19:51	1:00:47	+1:49
7	Josefine Doseth	Germany	9:46	0:24	30:18	0:27	20:10	1:01:05	+2:07
8	Avalyn Thompson	United States	9:53	0:26	32:09	0:24	18:42	1:01:34	+2:36
9	Ambre Ugolini	France	9:39	0:23	30:20	0:25	20:49	1:01:36	+2:38
10	Julia Ivanova	Slovakia	9:47	0:25	30:18	0:24	21:11	1:02:05	+3:07
11	Lia Depret	Belgium	10:03	0:23	32:53	0:24	18:36	1:02:19	+3:21
12	Manuela Ortega	Ecuador	10:19	0:24	32:37	0:24	19:56	1:03:40	+4:42
13	Enge Xu	China	9:27	0:24	32:38	0:29	20:46	1:03:44	+4:46
14	TG Crisan	Romania	10:02	0:23	32:53	0:23	20:14	1:03:55	+4:57
15	Yuet Hei Ng	Hong Kong	10:07	0:23	32:50	0:27	20:11	1:03:58	+5:00
16	Alexis Lashley	Barbados	9:42	0:28	32:17	0:30	21:10	1:04:07	+5:09
17	Masa Markovic	Serbia	9:53	0:24	32:12	0:29	21:30	1:04:28	+5:30
18	Rachel O'Donoghue	Zimbabwe	10:16	0:21	32:43	0:25	21:22	1:05:07	+6:09
19	Victoria Arce Nunez	Costa Rica	10:24	0:25	34:47	0:22	19:54	1:05:52	+6:54
20	Aira Martha Ardistri	Indonesia	9:48	0:26	33:12	0:27	22:00	1:05:53	+6:55
21	Ayse Simay Sahan	Turkey	10:48	0:25	34:22	0:23	20:07	1:06:05	+7:07
22	Joudy Fathy	Egypt	11:04	0:26	32:48	0:26	22:00	1:06:44	+7:46
23	C Moreno Velasco	Colombia	10:24	0:25	33:44	0:25	22:00	1:06:58	+8:00
24	Eunsol Bae	South Korea	9:51	0:36	32:57	0:27	23:12	1:07:03	+8:05 1P
25	Charlotte Thurston	United Arab Emirates	10:38	0:21	34:34	0:27	22:29	1:08:29	+9:31
26	AS Lopez Sanchez	Guatemala	10:24	0:24	37:11	0:30	21:37	1:10:06	+11:08
27	SN Berrached	Algeria	10:47	0:26	37:00	0:26	22:41	1:11:20	+12:22
28	Maria Alhaddadein	Jordan	10:47	0:25	36:08	0:29	23:35	1:11:24	+12:26 1P
29	Keira Rajabalee	Mauritius	10:29	0:25	39:24	0:28	23:40	1:14:26	+15:28
30	Olivia Postrzygacz	Cook Islands	13:22	0:26	36:52	0:31	25:13	1:16:24	+17:26
31	Coura Sall	Senegal	13:19	0:24	40:55	0:30	22:20	1:17:28	+18:30 1P
32	Elengoi Gibbons	Palau	13:32	0:29	41:46	0:31	24:48	1:21:06	+22:08
