= Kiribati at the 2010 Summer Youth Olympics =

- IOC code: KIR
- NOC: National Olympic Committee of Kiribati

in Singapore
- Competitors: 4 in 3 sports
- Flag bearer: Kaburee Ione
- Medals: Gold 0 Silver 0 Bronze 0 Total 0

Summer Youth Olympics appearances
- 2010; 2014; 2018

Kiribati participated in the 2010 Summer Youth Olympics in Singapore City, Singapore. 4 athletes received the right to participate in championships.

== Participants ==
=== Athletics ===
==== Boys ====
Track and road events

| Athletes | Event | Qualification | | Final | |
| Athletes | Event | Result | Rank | Result | Rank |
|---|---|---|---|---|---|
| Nooa Takooa | Boys' 100m | DNS | -- qE | DNS | -- |

==== Girls ====
Track and road events

| Athletes | Event | Qualification | | Final | |
| Athletes | Event | Result | Rank | Result | Rank |
|---|---|---|---|---|---|
| Tio Etita | Girls' 100m | 14.59 | 34 qE | 14.43 | 32 |

=== Taekwondo ===
Women's

| Athlete | Event | Preliminary | Quarterfinal | Semifinal | Final | Rank |
|---|---|---|---|---|---|---|
| Kaburee Ioane | -55kg | Michele Dorkenoo (TOG); W RSC | Shafinas Abdul Rahman (SIN); L RSC | Did not advance | | |

=== Weightlifting ===
Boys

| Athlete | Event | Snatch | Clean & Jerk | Total | Rank |
|---|---|---|---|---|---|
| Kabuati Silas Bob | 77kg | 100 | 130 | 230 | 7 |
