= Athletics at the 2026 Summer Youth Olympics – Men's 100 metres =

Athletics event at the IV Summer Youth Olympic Games

Men's 100 metres at the IV Summer Youth Olympic Games
- Venue: Complexe Iba Mar Diop
- Date: 8 November 2026
- Competitors: 16 from 16 nations

Medalists
1st place, gold medalist(s)		Gift Bright	Nigeria
2nd place, silver medalist(s)		Hangyu Zhang	China
3rd place, bronze medalist(s)		Szymon Dolega	Poland

The men's 100 metres competition at the 2026 Summer Youth Olympics was held on 8 November, at the Complexe Iba Mar Diop in Dakar, Senegal.

== Schedule ==
All times are in local time (UTC±0).

Date	Time	Round
Sunday, 8 November 2026	15:01	Semi-finals
Sunday, 8 November 2026	17:32	Final

== Results ==
=== Semi-finals ===
The semi-finals were held on 8 November 2026. The first four athletes in each semi-final (Q) and the next fastest athlete (q) qualified for the final.

Rank	Bib	Athlete	Nation	Semi-final	Position	Result	Notes
1	428	Gift Bright	Nigeria	2	1	10.34	Q, PB
2	333	Hangyu Zhang	China	1	1	10.68	Q
3	386	Lorenzo Cappellini	Italy	2	2	10.76	Q
4	441	Szymon Dolega	Poland	1	2	10.88	Q
5	448	Manuel Pérez	Puerto Rico	2	3	10.94	Q
6	439	Kabake Lansana	Papua New Guinea	1	3	10.99	Q, PB
7	311	Md Shipon Mia	Bangladesh	2	4	11.09	Q, PB
8	423	France Roda	Mozambique	2	5	11.50	q, PB
9	467	Mvuselelo Mkhwanazi	Eswatini	2	6	11.51	PB
10	308	Daniil Shuvayev	Azerbaijan	1	4	11.57	Q
11	422	Maxime Connen	Monaco	2	7	11.67	
12	425	Mohamed M'Bareck Said	Mauritania	2	8	12.00	PB
13	413	Ishmael Spakar	Malawi	1	5	12.23	PB
14	405	Thatsanay Khotkhounxap	Laos	1	6	12.31	PB
15	438	Zane Ililau	Palau	1	7	12.70	PB
	434	Franklin Rodríguez	Panama	1		DNF	

=== Final ===
The final was held on 8 November 2026. The wind assistance was +1.7 m/s.

Rank	Lane	Bib	Athlete	Nation	Result	Reaction time	Remark
1st place, gold medalist(s)	6	428	Gift Bright	Nigeria	10.28	0.167	PB
2nd place, silver medalist(s)	4	333	Hangyu Zhang	China	10.57	0.163	
3rd place, bronze medalist(s)	5	441	Szymon Dolega	Poland	10.61	0.152	
4	7	386	Lorenzo Cappellini	Italy	10.69	0.185	
5	3	448	Manuel Pérez	Puerto Rico	10.88	0.157	PB
6	8	439	Kabake Lansana	Papua New Guinea	10.91	0.169	PB
7	9	311	Md Shipon Mia	Bangladesh	11.18	0.142	
8	1	423	France Roda	Mozambique	11.39	0.176	PB
9	2	308	Daniil Shuvayev	Azerbaijan	11.46	0.158	
