= Saint Kitts and Nevis at the 2026 Summer Youth Olympics =

- Flag of Saint Kitts and Nevis
- IOC code: SKN
- NOC: Saint Kitts and Nevis Olympic Committee
- Website: www.sknoc.org

in Dakar, Senegal October 31, 2026 – November 13, 2026
- Competitors: 1 in 1 sport
- Medals: Gold 0 Silver 0 Bronze 0 Total 0

Summer Youth Olympics appearances
- 2010; 2014; 2018; 2026

Saint Kitts and Nevis is scheduled to compete at the 2026 Summer Youth Olympics in Dakar, Senegal from October 31 to November 13, 2026. This will mark Saint Kitts and Nevis's fourth appearance at the Youth Olympics, after making its debut in 2010.

As Saint Kitts and Nevis did not sent a flagbearer, a Dakar 2026 volunteer took over the role during the opening ceremony.

== Competitors ==
The following is the list of number of competitors participating at the Games per sport/discipline.

Sport	Men	Women	Total
Athletics	0	1	1
Total	0	1	1

== Athletics ==
Saint Kitts and Nevis entered one female athlete.

=== Track & road events ===
Women

Athlete	Event	Heat		Semifinal		Final	
Athlete	Event	Result	Rank	Result	Rank	Result	Rank
Khylinn Prentice	100 m						
