= Fencing at the 2026 Summer Youth Olympics – Men's foil =

Men's foil fencing event at the 2026 Summer Youth Olympics

Men's foil at the IV Summer Youth Olympic Games
- Venue: Dakar Expo Center
- Dates: 9 November
- Competitors: 14 from 14 nations

Medalists
1st place, gold medalist(s)		Ho Shing Him Harris; Hong Kong
2nd place, silver medalist(s)		Masashi Maeda; Japan
3rd place, bronze medalist(s)		Aris Kiayias; Cyprus

The men's foil competition at the 2026 Summer Youth Olympics was held at the Dakar Expo Center in Dakar, Senegal, on 9 November 2026. Fourteen fencers from fourteen National Olympic Committees competed in the event.

== Schedule ==
The competition was held on 9 November 2026 at the Dakar Expo Center. All times were as listed in the official competition schedule.

Date	Time	Estimated finish	Phase
9 November 2026	09:00	10:45	Pool round
9 November 2026	11:15	11:55	Table of 16
9 November 2026	12:15	12:35	Table of 8
9 November 2026	14:00	14:40	Semifinals
9 November 2026	15:00	15:20	Bronze medal bout
9 November 2026	15:30	15:50	Gold medal bout

== Format ==
The competition consisted of a pool round followed by direct elimination. Fourteen fencers were divided into two pools of seven athletes each. Within each pool, every fencer competed against all the other fencers in the same pool.

During the pool round, each bout consisted of one period of three minutes. The winner was the first fencer to score five valid hits or the fencer with the most hits when time expired. In the event of a tie, an additional one-minute period was held, with the first fencer to score a hit declared the winner. If neither fencer scored during the additional period, the winner was determined by a draw conducted by the referee before the period began.

Following the pool round, a general ranking was established using the victory index (V/M), the difference between hits scored and hits received (HS–HR), and the total number of hits scored (HS), in that order. This ranking determined the seeding for the direct elimination rounds.

The direct elimination competition consisted of the Table of 16, Table of 8, semifinals and finals. Each elimination bout consisted of three three-minute periods, with one-minute intervals between periods. The winner was the first fencer to score 15 hits or the fencer with the highest score after nine minutes. In the event of a tie, an additional one-minute deciding period was held under the golden goal rule.

The winners of the semifinals competed for the gold medal, while the semifinal losers competed for the bronze medal.

== Results ==
=== Pool round ===
Fourteen fencers were divided into two pools of seven. The following tables show the pool results as published by the official Dakar 2026 results service.

==== Pool 1 ====
Pos.	Athlete	(Cyprus)	(Costa Rica)	(Senegal)	(Venezuela)	(Algeria)	(Denmark)	(Hong Kong)	V#	M#	V/M	HS	HR	Diff.	PR
1	Aris Kiayias (CYP)		1	V	V	V	V	V	5	6	0.833	26	13	+13	2
2	Sebastian Acosta Murillo (CRC)	V		V	2	V	0	0	3	6	0.500	17	22	−5	5
3	Abdourahmane Marieme Sy (SEN)	1	3		2	3	1	0	0	6	0.000	10	29	−19	7
4	Angel Santiago Martinez Bravo (VEN)	2	V	V		V	3	1	3	6	0.500	21	20	+1	4
5	Ziad Abdelah Benabed (ALG)	1	3	V4	1		2	2	1	6	0.167	13	28	−15	6
6	Hannibal Lykke Kofoed (DEN)	2	V	V	V	V		1	4	6	0.667	23	16	+7	3
7	Ho Shing Him Harris (HKG)	2	V	V	V	V	V		5	6	0.833	27	9	+18	1

==== Pool 2 ====
Pos.	Athlete	(Belarus)	(Qatar)	(United Kingdom)	(Mali)	(Czech Republic)	(Lithuania)	(Japan)	V#	M#	V/M	HS	HR	Diff.	PR
1	Dzianis Maslau (BLR)		V	V	V	3	V	2	4	6	0.667	25	16	+9	3
2	Adham Eldeeb (QAT)	2		0	V	V	V	3	3	6	0.500	20	21	−1	5
3	Mohammed Belbouab (GBR)	2	V		V	V	V	2	4	6	0.667	24	14	+10	2
4	Thierno Hady Thiam (MLI)	0	0	0		0	0	1	0	6	0.000	1	30	−29	7
5	Krystof Novak (CZE)	V	4	3	V		V	1	3	6	0.500	23	20	+3	4
6	Dominik Juras (LTU)	2	2	1	V	2		0	1	6	0.167	12	25	−13	6
7	Masashi Maeda (JPN)	V	V	V	V	V	V		6	6	1.000	30	9	+21	1

Legend

- V – Victory
- V4 – Victory with four hits received
- Number – Hits scored by the fencer in a lost bout
- V# – Number of victories
- M# – Number of bouts
- V/M – Victory index (victories divided by bouts)
- HS – Hits scored
- HR – Hits received
- Diff. – Difference between hits scored and hits received (HS − HR)
- PR – Rank in pool

=== Bracket ===
Table of 16
1	Masashi Maeda (JPN)	BYE
16
9	Adham Eldeeb (QAT)	15
8	Angel Santiago Martinez Bravo (VEN)	12
12	Ziad Abdelah Benabed (ALG)	5
5	Dzianis Maslau (BLR)	15
13	Abdourahmane Marieme Sy (SEN)	1
4	Mohammed Belbouab (GBR)	15
3	Aris Kiayias (CYP)	15
14	Thierno Hady Thiam (MLI)	0
11	Dominik Juras (LTU)	14
6	Hannibal Lykke Kofoed (DEN)	15
7	Krystof Novak (CZE)	15
10	Sebastian Acosta Murillo (CRC)	9
2	Ho Shing Him Harris (HKG)
15	BYE

Quarterfinals
1	Masashi Maeda (JPN)	15
9	Adham Eldeeb (QAT)	10
5	Dzianis Maslau (BLR)	7
4	Mohammed Belbouab (GBR)	15
3	Aris Kiayias (CYP)	15
6	Hannibal Lykke Kofoed (DEN)	6
7	Krystof Novak (CZE)	2
2	Ho Shing Him Harris (HKG)	15

Semifinals
1	Masashi Maeda (JPN)	15
4	Mohammed Belbouab (GBR)	13
3	Aris Kiayias (CYP)	10
2	Ho Shing Him Harris (HKG)	15

Finals
1	Masashi Maeda (JPN)	8
2	Ho Shing Him Harris (HKG)	8
Bronze medal match
4	Mohammed Belbouab (GBR)	14
3	Aris Kiayias (CYP)	15

=== Final standings ===
The men's foil individual competition was held at the Dakar Expo Center, with the final standings confirmed on 9 November 2026. Ho Shing Him Harris of Hong Kong, China won the gold medal, defeating Masashi Maeda of Japan, who took silver. Aris Kiayias of Cyprus finished third to win bronze.

Rank	Athlete	Nation
1st place, gold medalist(s)	Ho Shing Him Harris	Hong Kong
2nd place, silver medalist(s)	Masashi Maeda	Japan
3rd place, bronze medalist(s)	Aris Kiayias	Cyprus
4	Mohammed Belbouab	Great Britain
5	Dzianis Maslau	Belarus
6	Hannibal Lykke Kofoed	Denmark
7	Krystof Novak	Czech Republic
8	Adham Eldeeb	Qatar
9	Angel Santiago Martinez Bravo	Venezuela
10	Sebastian Acosta Murillo	Costa Rica
11	Dominik Juras	Lithuania
12	Ziad Abdelah Benabed	Algeria
13	Abdourahmane Marieme Sy	Senegal
14	Thierno Hady Thiam	Mali
