= Athletics at the 2026 Summer Youth Olympics – Women's 100 metres =

Athletics event at the 2026 Summer Youth Olympics

Women's 100 metres at the IV Summer Youth Olympic Games
- Venue: Complexe Iba Mar Diop
- Date: 8 November
- Competitors: 18 from 18 nations

Medalists
1st place, gold medalist(s)		Rosemary Nwankwo	Nigeria
2nd place, silver medalist(s)		Arwa Ali	United Arab Emirates
3rd place, bronze medalist(s)		Dana Salem	Qatar

The women's 100 metres competition at the 2026 Summer Youth Olympics was held on 8 November at the Complexe Iba Mar Diop in Dakar, Senegal.

== Schedule ==
All times are in local time (UTC).

Date	Time	Round
Sunday, 8 November 2026	14:44	Semi-finals
Sunday, 8 November 2026	17:23	Final
Sunday, 8 November 2026	18:03	Victory ceremony

== Results ==
=== Semi-finals ===
The semi-finals consisted of two heats. The first four athletes in each heat (Q) qualified automatically for the final. One additional athlete with the fastest time among the remaining competitors (q) also advanced to the final. A total of nine athletes qualified for the final.

The abbreviation Q denotes qualification by finishing position, while q denotes qualification by time. Athletes who did not meet either qualification criterion were eliminated.

Overall rank	Semi-final	Bib	Lane	Athlete	Nation	Reaction time	Result	Notes
1	SF2	228	4	Rosemary Nwankwo	Nigeria	0.161	11.53	Q
2	SF2	279	5	Arwa Ali	United Arab Emirates	0.158	11.70	Q
3	SF1	240	1	Dana Salem	Qatar	0.160	11.75	Q
4	SF1	206	5	Ieva Malnaca	Latvia	0.159	11.99	Q
5	SF2	143	6	Alma Borregaard Ravn	Denmark	0.186	12.12	Q
6	SF1	209	7	Fiona Matt	Liechtenstein	0.172	12.15	Q
7	SF1	253	6	Khylinn Prentice	Saint Kitts and Nevis	0.173	12.41	Q
8	SF2	219	3	Eva Mitevska	North Macedonia	0.197	12.58	Q
9	SF2	225	7	Shelly Nyana Reyes	Nicaragua	0.179	12.63	q
10	SF1	109	3	Astghik Panosyan	Armenia	0.137	12.83	=PB
11	SF2	132	8	Bosson Grecy Hillary Niamien	Ivory Coast	0.208	12.86	PB
12	SF2	261	9	Mary Manyiel	South Sudan	0.175	13.63	PB
13	SF2	169	2	Grace Massala	Gabon	0.180	13.78	PB
14	SF1	201	2	Tuata Tatoa	Kiribati	0.203	14.03	PB
15	SF1	223	9	Faty Sy	Mauritania	0.208	14.80	PB
16	SF2	263	1	Yathreb Anwar Malek Alsamani	Sudan	0.259	15.14	PB
—	SF1	126	4	Roxana Ramirez	Chile		DQ	TR16.8
—	SF1	171	8	Aminata Balde	Guinea-Bissau		DNS	

=== Final ===
The final was held on 8 November 2026. The wind assistance was +2.4 m/s.

Rank	Lane	Bib	Athlete	Nation	Result	Reaction time
1st place, gold medalist(s)	5	228	Rosemary Nwankwo	Nigeria	11.16	0.133
2nd place, silver medalist(s)	7	279	Arwa Ali	United Arab Emirates	11.41	0.133
3rd place, bronze medalist(s)	6	240	Dana Salem	Qatar	11.48	0.158
4	3	143	Alma Borregaard Ravn	Denmark	11.75	0.157
5	4	206	Ieva Malnaca	Latvia	11.82	0.158
6	8	209	Fiona Matt	Liechtenstein	11.93	0.159
7	1	225	Shelly Nyana Reyes	Nicaragua	12.08	0.156
8	2	219	Eva Mitevska	North Macedonia	12.28	0.152
9	9	253	Khylinn Prentice	Saint Kitts and Nevis	12.35	0.178
