= Beach wrestling at the 2026 Summer Youth Olympics – Men's 80 kg =

Men's 80 kg at the IV Summer Youth Olympic Games
- Venue: Saly Beach West
- Date: 7 November 2026
- Competitors: 12 from 12 nations

Medalists
1st place, gold medalist(s)		Maguette Diop; Senegal
2nd place, silver medalist(s)		Nihad Suleymanli; Azerbaijan
3rd place, bronze medalist(s)		Reza Jalilian; Iran

The Men's 80 kg competition in beach wrestling at the 2026 Summer Youth Olympics was held on 7 November 2026 at Saly Beach West.

== Competition format ==
The competition was contested under the beach wrestling rules. Twelve wrestlers were divided into three groups of four athletes each. The wrestlers competed in a round-robin format within their respective groups. The group winners and the best second-placed wrestler advanced to the semifinals. The semifinal winners competed in the gold-medal match, while the semifinal losers contested the bronze-medal match.

== Results ==
Legend

- F — Won by fall
- WO — Won by walkover

=== Notes ===
- LIGHT and DARK indicate the assigned colours of the wrestlers in each bout.
- Technical points represent the points scored by each wrestler during a match.
- Classification points are awarded according to the match result and are used to determine the group standings.
- Q – Qualified for the semifinals as the group winner.
- q – Qualified for the semifinals as the best second-placed wrestler across all groups.

==== Results codes ====
Code	Meaning
VSU	Victory with 3 points, without a 3-point takedown or throw, and without any points scored by the opponent.
VSU1	Victory with 3 points, without a 3-point takedown or throw, but with points scored by the opponent.
VFA	Victory by a 3-point takedown or throw, without any points scored by the opponent.
VFA1	Victory by a 3-point takedown or throw, with points scored by the opponent.
VPO	Victory with less than 3 points.

=== Group stage ===
==== Group A ====
Round	Match number	Colour	Athlete	NOC code	Technical points	Classification points	Results code
1	25	LIGHT	Reza Jalilian	Iran	2	1	VFA1
1	25	DARK	Konstantinos Mourtzilakis	Greece	4	4	VFA1
1	26	LIGHT	Layden Oscar Acevedo Cordero	Puerto Rico	3	2	VSU
1	26	DARK	Francesco Moffa	Italy	0	0	VSU
2	37	LIGHT	Reza Jalilian	Iran	3	2	VSU1
2	37	DARK	Layden Oscar Acevedo Cordero	Puerto Rico	1	1	VSU1
2	38	LIGHT	Konstantinos Mourtzilakis	Greece	3	2	VSU
2	38	DARK	Francesco Moffa	Italy	0	0	VSU
3	73	LIGHT	Reza Jalilian	Iran	5	4	VFA
3	73	DARK	Francesco Moffa	Italy	0	0	VFA
3	74	LIGHT	Konstantinos Mourtzilakis	Greece	3	2	VSU1
3	74	DARK	Layden Oscar Acevedo Cordero	Puerto Rico	1	1	VSU1

Rank	Athlete	NOC code	Matches won	Classification points	Technical points scored	Technical points conceded	Draw number	Qualification
1	Konstantinos Mourtzilakis	Greece	3	8	10	3	77	Q
2	Reza Jalilian	Iran	2	7	10	5	5	q
3	Layden Oscar Acevedo Cordero	Puerto Rico	1	4	5	6	97	
4	Francesco Moffa	Italy	0	0	0	11	254	

==== Group B ====
Round	Match number	Colour	Athlete	NOC code	Technical points	Classification points	Results code
1	27	LIGHT	Dmytro Holovenko	Ukraine	3	4	VFA
1	27	DARK	Vicente Jacob James Mettao	Palau	0	0	VFA
1	28	LIGHT	Bohdan Kvantaliani	Georgia	2	1	VSU1
1	28	DARK	Maguette Diop	Senegal	3	2	VSU1
2	39	LIGHT	Dmytro Holovenko	Ukraine	3	2	VSU
2	39	DARK	Bohdan Kvantaliani	Georgia	0	0	VSU
2	40	LIGHT	Vicente Jacob James Mettao	Palau	0	0	VSU
2	40	DARK	Maguette Diop	Senegal	3	2	VSU
3	75	LIGHT	Dmytro Holovenko	Ukraine	0	0	VSU
3	75	DARK	Maguette Diop	Senegal	3	2	VSU
3	76	LIGHT	Vicente Jacob James Mettao	Palau	1	1	VSU1
3	76	DARK	Bohdan Kvantaliani	Georgia	3	2	VSU1

Rank	Athlete	NOC code	Matches won	Classification points	Technical points scored	Technical points conceded	Draw number	Qualification
1	Maguette Diop	Senegal	3	6	9	2	136	Q
2	Dmytro Holovenko	Ukraine	2	6	6	3	6	
3	Bohdan Kvantaliani	Georgia	1	3	5	7	104	
4	Vicente Jacob James Mettao	Palau	0	1	1	9	58	

==== Group C ====
Round	Match number	Colour	Athlete	NOC code	Technical points	Classification points	Results code
1	29	LIGHT	Nihad Suleymanli	Azerbaijan	4	4	VFA
1	29	DARK	Yasser Kraled Kebir	Algeria	0	0	VFA
1	30	LIGHT	Deepanshu Khokhar	India	2	1	VSU1
1	30	DARK	Abdeljalil Benelyassar	Morocco	3	2	VSU1
2	41	LIGHT	Nihad Suleymanli	Azerbaijan	3	2	VSU
2	41	DARK	Deepanshu Khokhar	India	0	0	VSU
2	42	LIGHT	Yasser Kraled Kebir	Algeria	3	2	VSU
2	42	DARK	Abdeljalil Benelyassar	Morocco	0	0	VSU
3	77	LIGHT	Nihad Suleymanli	Azerbaijan	3	2	VSU1
3	77	DARK	Abdeljalil Benelyassar	Morocco	1	1	VSU1
3	78	LIGHT	Yasser Kraled Kebir	Algeria	3	2	VSU
3	78	DARK	Deepanshu Khokhar	India	0	0	VSU

Rank	Athlete	NOC code	Matches won	Classification points	Technical points scored	Technical points conceded	Draw number	Qualification
1	Nihad Suleymanli	Azerbaijan	3	8	10	1	13	Q
2	Yasser Kraled Kebir	Algeria	2	4	6	4	37	
3	Abdeljalil Benelyassar	Morocco	1	3	4	8	131	
4	Deepanshu Khokhar	India	0	1	2	9	115	

=== Finals ===
The semifinals featured the three group winners and the best second-placed wrestler. Nihad Suleymanli defeated Konstantinos Mourtzilakis, while Maguette Diop defeated Reza Jalilian to advance to the gold-medal match. Diop subsequently won the gold medal by defeating Suleymanli 4–0 by VFA. Jalilian secured the bronze medal after defeating Mourtzilakis 4–2 by VSU1.

Semifinals
1	Konstantinos Mourtzilakis (GRE)	0
4	Nihad Suleymanli (AZE)	3
3	Maguette Diop (SEN)	4
2	Reza Jalilian (IRI)	2

Final
Maguette Diop (SEN)	4
Nihad Suleymanli (AZE)	0

Bronze-medal match
Reza Jalilian (IRI)	4
Konstantinos Mourtzilakis (GRE)	2

=== Final classification ===
Rank	Athlete	NOC
1st place, gold medalist(s)	Maguette Diop	Senegal
2nd place, silver medalist(s)	Nihad Suleymanli	Azerbaijan
3rd place, bronze medalist(s)	Reza Jalilian	Iran
4	Konstantinos Mourtzilakis	Greece
5	Dmytro Holovenko	Ukraine
6	Yasser Kraled Kebir	Algeria
7	Layden Oscar Acevedo Cordero	Puerto Rico
8	Bohdan Kvantaliani	Georgia
9	Abdeljalil Benelyassar	Morocco
10	Deepanshu Khokhar	India
11	Vicente Jacob James Mettao	Palau
12	Francesco Moffa	Italy
