= Belize at the 2010 Summer Youth Olympics =

- IOC code: BIZ
- NOC: Belize Olympic Committee
- Website: www.olympic.org/belize

in Singapore
- Competitors: 3 in 1 sport
- Flag bearer: Jaleel Lino
- Medals: Gold 0 Silver 0 Bronze 0 Total 0

Summer Youth Olympics appearances
- 2010; 2014; 2018

Belize participated in the 2010 Summer Youth Olympics in Singapore.

== Athletics ==
Note: The athletes who do not have a "Q" next to their Qualification Rank advance to a non-medal ranking final.

=== Boys ===
Track and Road Events

Athletes	Event	Qualification		Final	
Athletes	Event	Result	Rank	Result	Rank
Jaleel Lino	100m	11.93	27 qD	11.81	26
Jason Leslie	200m	25.63	24 qD	25.43	22

=== Girls ===
Track and Road Events

Athletes	Event	Qualification		Final	
Athletes	Event	Result	Rank	Result	Rank
Leanne Murray	Girls’ 100m	14.24	32 qE	13.83	30
