= Yemen at the 2014 Summer Youth Olympics =

- IOC code: YEM
- NOC: Yemen Olympic Committee

in Nanjing
- Competitors: 3 in 3 sports
- Medals: Gold 0 Silver 0 Bronze 0 Total 0

Summer Youth Olympics appearances
- 2010; 2014; 2018

Yemen competed at the 2014 Summer Youth Olympics, in Nanjing, China from 16 August to 28 August 2014.

== Athletics ==
Yemen qualified one athlete.

Qualification Legend: Q=Final A (medal); qB=Final B (non-medal); qC=Final C (non-medal); qD=Final D (non-medal); qE=Final E (non-medal)

Girls
Track & road events

Athlete	Event	Heats		Final	
Athlete	Event	Result	Rank	Result	Rank
Hanin Thabit	800 m	2:40.29	20 qC	2:38.61	19

== Taekwondo ==
Yemen was given a wild card to compete.

Boys

Athlete	Event	Round of 16	Quarterfinals	Semifinals	Final	Rank
Athlete	Event	Opposition Result	Opposition Result	Opposition Result	Opposition Result	Rank
Basheer Ghazal	−48 kg	T Hanprab (THA); L 5 – 18	did not advance			9

== Wrestling ==
Yemen was given a spot to compete from the Tripartite Commission.

Key:
- VT - Victory by Fall.
- PP - Decision by Points - the loser with technical points.
- PO - Decision by Points - the loser without technical points.

Boys

Athlete	Event	Group stage				Final / RM	Rank
Athlete	Event	Opposition Score	Opposition Score	Opposition Score	Rank	Opposition Score	Rank
Ebrahim Al-Shebami	Freestyle -54kg	R Louw (RSA); W 3 – 1 ^{PP}	E Sejfulau (MKD); L 1 – 3 ^{PP}	D Fix (USA); L 1 – 4 ^{ST}	2 Q	V Matevosyan (ARM); L 0 – 4 ^{ST}	4
