= Denmark at the 2026 Summer Youth Olympics =

- IOC code: DEN
- NOC: Danish National Olympic Committee
- Website: www.dif.dk

in Dakar, Senegal
- Competitors: 8 in 5 sports
- Flag bearers: Axel Boesen and Sophia Loudrup (opening)
- Medals: Gold 0 Silver 0 Bronze 0 Total 0

Summer Youth Olympics appearances
- 2010; 2014; 2018; 2026

Denmark will take part in the 2026 Summer Youth Olympics in Dakar, Senegal.

== Competitors ==
A team of eight athletes was announced on 5 October 2026 by the Danish National Olympic Committee on its social media channels.

Sport	Boys	Girls	Total
Athletics	2	1	3
Badminton	1	1	2
Breaking	1	0	1
Fencing	1	0	1
Triathlon	1	0	1
Total	6	2	8

== Athletics ==
Track and road events

Athlete	Event	Semifinal		Final	
Athlete	Event	Result	Rank	Result	Rank
Alma Børregaard Ravn	Women's 100 m	12.12	3 Q	11.75	4
Magnus Abildgaard Kofoed	Men's 800 m				
Magne Lippert	Men's 3000 m	—N/a		9:08.40	9

== Badminton ==
Athlete	Event	Group stage				Quarterfinals	Semifinals	Final / BM	
Athlete	Event	Opposition Result	Opposition Result	Opposition Result	Rank	Opposition Result	Opposition Result	Opposition Result	Rank
Axel Boesen	Men's singles	Silva (BRA); W 21–17 21–9	Hong (CHN); L 11–21 19–21	Aksara (INA); L 15–21 10–21	3	Did not qualify			
Sophia Loudrup	Women's singles	Silva (POR); W 21–14 21–18	Kandala (FIN); W 21–11 21–10	Zhang (CHN); L 5–21 8–21	2	Did not qualify			

== Breaking ==
Athlete	Nickname	Event	Round-Robin		Quarterfinal	Semifinal	Final / BM	
Athlete	Nickname	Event	Points	Rank	Opposition Result	Opposition Result	Opposition Result	Rank
William Stokkebroe	Ill Will	B-Boys						

== Fencing ==
Athlete	Event	Pool Stage		Table of 16	Table of 8	Semifinal	Final / BM	
Athlete	Event	Record	Rank	Opposition Score	Opposition Score	Opposition Score	Opposition Score	Rank
Hannibal Lykke Kofoed	Men's foil							

== Triathlon ==
Athlete	Event	Time						Rank
Athlete	Event	Swim (750 m)	Trans 1	Bike (20 km)	Trans 2	Run (5 km)	Total	Rank
Gustav Langkær	Men's	8:28	0:21	28:22	0:24	17:06	54:41	12
