= Liechtenstein at the 2026 Summer Youth Olympics =

- Flag of Liechtenstein
- IOC code: LIE
- NOC: Liechtenstein Olympic Committee
- Website: www.olympic.li

in Dakar, Senegal 31 October 2026 – 13 November 2026
- Competitors: 1 in 1 sport
- Medals: Gold 0 Silver 0 Bronze 0 Total 0

Summer Youth Olympics appearances
- 2010; 2014; 2018; 2026

Liechtenstein is scheduled to compete at the 2026 Summer Youth Olympics in Dakar, Senegal from 31 October to 13 November 2026. This will mark Liechtenstein's fourth appearance at the Youth Olympics, after making its debut in 2010.

== Competitors ==
The following is the list of number of competitors participating at the Games per sport/discipline.

Sport	Boys	Girls	Total
Athletics	0	1	1
Total	0	1	1

== Athletics ==
Athlete	Event	Semifinal		Final	
Athlete	Event	Result	Rank	Result	Rank
Fiona Matt	100 m	12.15	6	11.93	6
