= Athletics at the 2010 Summer Youth Olympics – Boys' 200 metres =

Athletics – Boys' 200 metres at the I Summer Youth Olympic Games
- Venue: Bishan Stadium
- Date: August 19–22
- Competitors: 26 from 26 nations

Medalists
| 1st place, gold medalist(s) | | Xie Zhenye | China |
| 2nd place, silver medalist(s) | | Keisuke Homma | Japan |
| 3rd place, bronze medalist(s) | | Patrick Domogala | Germany |

The boys' 200 metres competition at the 2010 Youth Olympic Games was held on 19–22 August 2010 in Bishan Stadium.

== Schedule ==
| Date | Time | Round |
|---|---|---|
| 19 August 2010 | 10:50 | Heats |
| 22 August 2010 | 20:48 | Final |

== Records ==
Prior to the competition, the following records were as follows.

| World Youth Best | Usain Bolt (JAM) | 20.13 | Bridgetown, Barbados | 20 July 2003 |
| Championship Record | None | | | |
| World Youth Leading | Shangbin Lu (CHN) | 20.74 | Chongqing, China | 27 June 2010 |

No new records were set during the competition.

== Results ==
=== Heats ===
| Rank | Heat | Lane | Athlete | Time | Notes | Q |
|---|---|---|---|---|---|---|
| 1 | 3 | 5 | Xie Zhenye (CHN) | 21.27 | | FA |
| 2 | 4 | 6 | Patrick Domogala (GER) | 21.49 | | FA |
| 3 | 4 | 5 | António Cesar Rodrigues (BRA) | 21.70 | | FA |
| 4 | 4 | 3 | Keisuke Homma (JPN) | 21.74 | | FA |
| 5 | 4 | 7 | Jeneko Place (BER) | 21.76 | | FA |
| 6 | 2 | 6 | Tomasz Kluczyński (POL) | 21.80 | | FA |
| 7 | 3 | 6 | Brandon Sanders (USA) | 21.81 | | FA |
| 8 | 1 | 3 | Okeudo Jonathan Nmaju (NGR) | 21.91 | | FA |
| 9 | 3 | 4 | Guy-Elphège Anouman (FRA) | 21.95 | | FB |
| 10 | 3 | 3 | Oussman Gibba (GAM) | 22.09 | | FB |
| 11 | 3 | 2 | Darvin Sandy (TRI) | 22.12 | | FB |
| 12 | 1 | 6 | Luca Valbonesi (ITA) | 22.14 | | FB |
| 13 | 1 | 4 | Abdullah Alasiri (KSA) | 22.22 | | FB |
| 14 | 1 | 7 | Mlandvo Shongwe (SWZ) | 22.24 | PB | FB |
| 15 | 4 | 4 | Ts'Ehla Monethi (LES) | 22.38 | PB | FC |
| 16 | 1 | 8 | Davron Atabaev (TJK) | 22.61 | | FC |
| 17 | 2 | 5 | Siphelo Ngquboza (RSA) | 22.75 | | FC |
| 18 | 2 | 7 | J'Maal Alexander (IVB) | 22.97 | | FC |
| 19 | 2 | 8 | Isaac Gbadegesin (CIV) | 23.07 | | FC |
| 20 | 1 | 2 | Faisal Jasim Mohamed Mohamed (BRN) | 23.19 | | FC |
| 21 | 2 | 2 | Celso Francisco Cossa (MOZ) | 23.24 | | FD |
| 22 | 2 | 4 | Antimo-Constantino Oyono Nchama (GEQ) | 23.39 | | FD |
| 23 | 4 | 2 | Lonzo Wilkinson (SKN) | 23.76 | | FD |
| 24 | 3 | 7 | Jason Leslie (BIZ) | 25.63 | | FD |
| | 1 | 5 | John Rivan (PNG) | DSQ | F^{1} | FD |
| | 2 | 3 | Hensley Paulina (AHO) | DNS | | FD |

=== Finals ===
==== Final D ====
wind: +1.1 m/s

| Rank | Lane | Athlete | Time | Notes |
|---|---|---|---|---|
| 1 | 7 | John Rivan (PNG) | 22.12 | PB |
| 2 | 4 | Celso Francisco Cossa (MOZ) | 22.99 | |
| 3 | 3 | Antimo-Constantino Oyono Nchama (GEQ) | 23.08 | |
| 4 | 5 | Lonzo Wilkinson (SKN) | 23.23 | PB |
| 5 | 6 | Jason Leslie (BIZ) | 25.43 | PB |
| | 2 | Hensley Paulina (AHO) | DNS | |

==== Final C ====
wind: +0.5 m/s

| Rank | Lane | Athlete | Time | Notes |
|---|---|---|---|---|
| 1 | 6 | Ts'Ehla Monethi (LES) | 22.14 | PB |
| 2 | 3 | Davron Atabaev (TJK) | 22.24 | PB |
| 3 | 5 | J'Maal Alexander (IVB) | 22.73 | |
| 4 | 7 | Isaac Gbadegesin (CIV) | 23.05 | |
| | 4 | Siphelo Ngquboza (RSA) | DNS | |
| | 2 | Faisal Jasim Mohamed Mohamed (BRN) | DNS | |

==== Final B ====
wind: +0.3 m/s

| Rank | Lane | Athlete | Time | Notes |
|---|---|---|---|---|
| 1 | 4 | Luca Valbonesi (ITA) | 21.98 | |
| 2 | 6 | Darvin Sandy (TRI) | 22.15 | |
| 3 | 3 | Oussman Gibba (GAM) | 22.16 | |
| 4 | 2 | Mlandvo Shongwe (SWZ) | 22.46 | |
| 5 | 7 | Abdullah Alasiri (KSA) | 22.49 | |
| | 5 | Guy-Elphège Anouman (FRA) | DNS | |

==== Final A ====
wind: +0.1 m/s

| Rank | Lane | Athlete | Time | Notes |
|---|---|---|---|---|
| 1st place, gold medalist(s) | 4 | Xie Zhenye (CHN) | 21.22 | |
| 2nd place, silver medalist(s) | 5 | Keisuke Homma (JPN) | 21.27 | |
| 3rd place, bronze medalist(s) | 3 | Patrick Domogala (GER) | 21.36 | |
| 4 | 2 | Brandon Sanders (USA) | 21.44 | |
| 5 | 7 | Jeneko Place (BER) | 21.50 | |
| 6 | 3 | Okeudo Jonathan Nmaju (NGR) | 21.52 | |
| 7 | 8 | Tomasz Kluczyński (POL) | 21.56 | |
| 8 | 5 | António Cesar Rodrigues (BRA) | 21.60 | |
