= Athletics at the 2026 Summer Youth Olympics – Women's javelin throw =

Athletics event at the 2026 Summer Youth Olympics

Women's javelin throw at the IV Summer Youth Olympic Games
- Venue: Complexe Iba Mar Diop
- Date: 9 November 2026
- Competitors: 9 from 9 nations
- Winning time: 57.62 m

Medalists
1st place, gold medalist(s)		Ilsa Mayerlin Córdoba	Colombia
2nd place, silver medalist(s)		Parizoda Talabova	Uzbekistan
3rd place, bronze medalist(s)		Elīza Ligere	Latvia

The women's javelin throw event at the 2026 Summer Youth Olympics was held on 9 November 2026 at the Complexe Iba Mar Diop in Dakar, Senegal. The event was contested as a single final, with Ilsa Mayerlin Córdoba of Colombia winning the gold medal with a best throw of 57.62 metres.

== Schedule ==
The competition was scheduled for 9 November 2026 at 16:06 local time (UTC), at the Complexe Iba Mar Diop.

Date	Time	Round
9 November 2026	16:06	Final

== Results ==
The javelin throw competition consisted of a single final, in accordance with the official competition format for field events.

=== Final ===
The final was held on 9 November 2026. The competition began at 16:07 and concluded at 17:06.

Rank	Bib	Athlete	Nation	1	2	3	4	5	6	Result	Remark
1st place, gold medalist(s)	135	Ilsa Mayerlin Córdoba	Colombia	52.11	x	x	57.62	x	54.13	57.62	PB
2nd place, silver medalist(s)	291	Parizoda Talabova	Uzbekistan	49.81	45.85	53.22	x	52.38	54.68	54.68	PB
3rd place, bronze medalist(s)	205	Elīza Ligere	Latvia	x	43.99	52.00	x	51.27	46.17	52.00	
4	150	Remas Elwelily	Egypt	48.42	51.64	x	39.52	x	49.62	51.64	PB
5	105	Zonique Charles	Antigua and Barbuda	42.95	46.58	47.19	45.97	x	44.20	47.19	PB
6	129	Wang Changle	China	39.05	45.13	45.74	46.40	x	44.25	46.40	
7	273	Chen You-xin	Chinese Taipei	42.71	43.83	45.63	40.15	42.59	44.11	45.63	PB
8	222	Anđelina Lašić	Montenegro	43.86	43.03	42.98	44.28	43.41	40.60	44.28	PB
9	113	Tatiana Sousa	Bermuda	x	35.13	x	—	—	—	35.13	
