= Athletics at the 2010 Summer Youth Olympics – Boys' 100 metres =

Athletics – Boys' 100 metres at the I Summer Youth Olympic Games
- Venue: Bishan Stadium
- Date: August 18–21
- Competitors: 38 from 38 nations

Medalists
1st place, gold medalist(s)		Odean Skeen	Jamaica
2nd place, silver medalist(s)		Masaki Nashimoto	Japan
3rd place, bronze medalist(s)		David Bolarinwa	Great Britain

The boys' 100 metres competition at the 2010 Youth Olympic Games was held on 18–21 August 2010 in Bishan Stadium.

== Schedule ==
Date	Time	Round
18 August 2010	11:20	Heats
21 August 2010	10:38	Final

== Records ==
Prior to the competition, the following records were as follows.

World Youth Best	Rynell Parson (USA)	10.23	Indianapolis, USA	21 June 2007
Championship Record	None			
World Youth Leading	David Bolarinwa (GBR)	10.39	London, UK	4 August 2010

No new records were set during the competition.

== Results ==
=== Heats ===
Rank	Heat	Lane	Athlete	Time	Notes	Q
1	1	4	David Bolarinwa (GBR)	10.62		FA
2	3	8	Odean Skeen (JAM)	10.63		FA
3	3	6	Jirapong Meenapra (THA)	10.72		FA
4	2	3	Masaki Nashimoto (JPN)	10.74		FA
5	2	5	Tahir Walsh (ANT)	10.89		FA
6	5	6	Tinashe Samuel Mutanga (ZIM)	10.92		FA
7	4	6	Lepani Naivalu (FIJ)	10.94		FA
8	5	7	Mateo Edward (PAN)	10.99		FA
9	4	5	Jen-Chieh Chen (TPE)	11.00		FB
10	1	5	Carlos Manuel Nascimento (POR)	11.02		FB
11	2	4	Ayodele Taffe (TRI)	11.05		FB
12	4	4	Hector Ruiz (MEX)	11.05		FB
13	3	5	Chavez Ageday (GUY)	11.09		FB
14	4	7	Julian Munroe (BAH)	11.13		FB
15	2	1	Bruno Rojas (BOL)	11.14		FB
16	2	8	Tilak Ram Tharu (NEP)	11.21	Personal Best	FB
17	2	7	Daouda Diagne (SEN)	11.23		FC
18	2	2	Romuald Adzaba Ngawessi (CMR)	11.36		FC
19	2	6	Mohamed Sameeh (MDV)	11.44	Personal Best	FC
20	3	4	Yarride Rosario (NZL)	11.46		FC
21	4	8	Renaldo Charles (VIN)	11.47		FC
22	5	5	Zdenek Stromsik (CZE)	11.52		FC
23	1	6	Shijirbaatar Ganbold (MGL)	11.57		FC
24	1	1	El Hadad Houmadi (COM)	11.71		FC
25	5	2	Rodman Teltull (PLW)	11.71	Personal Best	FD
26	5	5	Ben Nombre (BUR)	11.71		FD
27	1	2	Jaleel Lino (BIZ)	11.93	Personal Best	FD
28	3	3	Mohamed Ould Medhadtt (MTN)	11.97		FD
29	1	8	Oumar Diallo (GUI)	12.01		FD
30	1	3	Ailton da Costa Oliveira (STP)	12.11		FD
31	4	2	Sitthideth Khanthavong (LAO)	12.11		FD
32	5	4	Emau Toluono (SAM)	12.17		FE
33	3	7	Apolo Livamento (CPV)	12.25		FE
34	5	3	Ahmad Farhad Nawabi (AFG)	12.45		FE
35	1	7	Adelino Anca Nanjola (GBS)	12.62		FE
	3	1	Ali Omar Abdulla Al Doseri (BRN)	DSQ	F^{1}	FE
	3	2	Julsian Gega (ALB)	DSQ	F^{2}	FE
	4	3	Nooa Takooa (KIR)	DNS		FE

=== Finals ===
==== Final E ====
wind: –0.3 m/s

Rank	Lane	Athlete	Time	Notes
1	7	Ali Omar Abdulla Al Doseri (BRN)	11.48	
2	5	Emau Toluono (SAM)	12.17	
3	3	Apolo Livamento (CPV)	12.24	
4	4	Ahmad Farhad Nawabi (AFG)	12.40	
5	6	Adelino Anca Nanjola (GBS)	12.67	
	8	Julsian Gega (ALB)	DNS	
	2	Nooa Takooa (KIR)	DNS	

==== Final D ====
wind: +0.2 m/s

Rank	Lane	Athlete	Time	Notes
1	4	Rodman Teltull (PLW)	11.45	Personal Best
2	3	Ben Nombre (BUR)	11.48	
3	8	Oumar Diallo (GUI)	11.62	
4	6	Jaleel Lino (BIZ)	11.81	Personal Best
5	2	Sitthideth Khanthavong (LAO)	11.92	
	7	Ailton da Costa Oliveira (STP)	DNS	
	5	Mohamed Ould Medhadtt (MTN)	DNS	

==== Final C ====
wind: –0.3 m/s

Rank	Lane	Athlete	Time	Notes
1	5	Daouda Diagne (SEN)	11.17	
2	3	Romuald Adzaba Ngawessi (CMR)	11.43	
3	8	Zdenek Stromsik (CZE)	11.45	
4	7	Renaldo Charles (VIN)	11.50	
5	1	Shijirbaatar Ganbold (MGL)	11.66	
6	6	Yarride Rosario (NZL)	11.73	
7	2	El Hadad Houmadi (COM)	11.74	
	4	Mohamed Sameeh (MDV)	DNS	

==== Final B ====
wind: 0.0 m/s

Rank	Lane	Athlete	Time	Notes
1	6	Carlos Manuel Nascimento (POR)	10.79	Personal Best
2	5	Hector Ruiz (MEX)	10.87	
3	3	Jen-Chieh Chen (TPE)	10.90	
4	7	Chavez Ageday (GUY)	10.90	
5	2	Bruno Rojas (BOL)	10.90	
6	4	Ayodele Taffe (TRI)	10.98	
7	8	Julian Munroe (BAH)	11.04	
	1	Tilak Ram Tharu (NEP)	DNS	

==== Final A ====
wind: +0.1 m/s

Rank	Lane	Athlete	Time	Notes
1st place, gold medalist(s)	5	Odean Skeen (JAM)	10.42	Personal Best
2nd place, silver medalist(s)	4	Masaki Nashimoto (JPN)	10.51	Personal Best
3rd place, bronze medalist(s)	6	David Bolarinwa (GBR)	10.51	
4	8	Tahir Walsh (ANT)	10.71	Seasonal Best
5	3	Jirapong Meenapra (THA)	10.71	
6	7	Tinashe Samuel Mutanga (ZIM)	10.72	
7	2	Lepani Naivalu (FIJ)	10.79	Personal Best
8	1	Mateo Edward (PAN)	10.80	
