= Bermuda at the 2010 Summer Youth Olympics =

- IOC code: BER
- NOC: Bermuda Olympic Association

in Singapore
- Competitors: 4 in 3 sports
- Flag bearer: Jeneko Place
- Medals: Gold 0 Silver 0 Bronze 0 Total 0

Summer Youth Olympics appearances
- 2010; 2014; 2018; 2026

Bermuda competed at the 2010 Summer Youth Olympics, the inaugural Youth Olympic Games, held in Singapore from 14 August to 26 August 2010.

== Athletics ==
=== Boys ===
Track and road events

Athletes	Event	Qualification		Final	
Athletes	Event	Result	Rank	Result	Rank
Jeneko Place	Boys' 200m	21.76	5 Q	21.50	5

=== Girls ===
Track and Road Events

Athletes	Event	Qualification		Final	
Athletes	Event	Result	Rank	Result	Rank
Taylor Bean	Girls’ 1000m	3:08.32	20 qB	3:11.46	25

== Sailing ==
One Person Dinghy

Athlete	Event	Race												Points	Rank
Athlete	Event	1	2	3	4	5	6	7	8	9	10	11	M*	Points	Rank
Owen Siese	Boys' Byte CII	~~18~~	2	2	11	~~12~~	8	8	6	9	4	11	13	74	6

== Triathlon ==
Men's

Athlete	Event	Swim (1.5 km)	Trans 1	Bike (40 km)	Trans 2	Run (10 km)	Total	Rank
Ryan Gunn	Individual	10:37	0:31	32:07	0:22	20:52	1:04:29.34	31
