= Saint Vincent and the Grenadines at the 2010 Summer Youth Olympics =

- IOC code: VIN
- NOC: The St. Vincent and the Grenadines National Olympic Committee

in Singapore
- Competitors: 3 in 2 sports
- Flag bearer: Renaldo Charles

Summer Youth Olympics appearances
- 2010; 2014; 2018

Saint Vincent and the Grenadines competed at the 2010 Summer Youth Olympics, the inaugural Youth Olympic Games, held in Singapore from 14 August to 26 August 2010.

== Athletics ==
Note: The athletes who do not have a "Q" next to their Qualification Rank advance to a non-medal ranking final.

=== Boys ===
Track and Road Events

| Athletes | Event | Qualification | | Final | |
| Athletes | Event | Result | Rank | Result | Rank |
|---|---|---|---|---|---|
| Renaldo Charles | Boys’ 100m | 11.47 | 21 qC | 11.50 | 19 |

=== Girls ===
Track and Road Events

| Athletes | Event | Qualification | | Final | |
| Athletes | Event | Result | Rank | Result | Rank |
|---|---|---|---|---|---|
| Shantal Rouse | Girls’ 100m | 12.85 | 19 qC | 13.03 | 19 |

== Taekwondo ==
| Athlete | Event | Preliminary | Quarterfinal | Semifinal | Final | Rank |
|---|---|---|---|---|---|---|
| Dasreen Primus | Girls' +63kg | BYE | Yuleimi Abreu (CUB); L RSC R1 0:35 | did not advance | | 5 |
