= Martha Bissah =

Ghanaian athlete (born 1997)

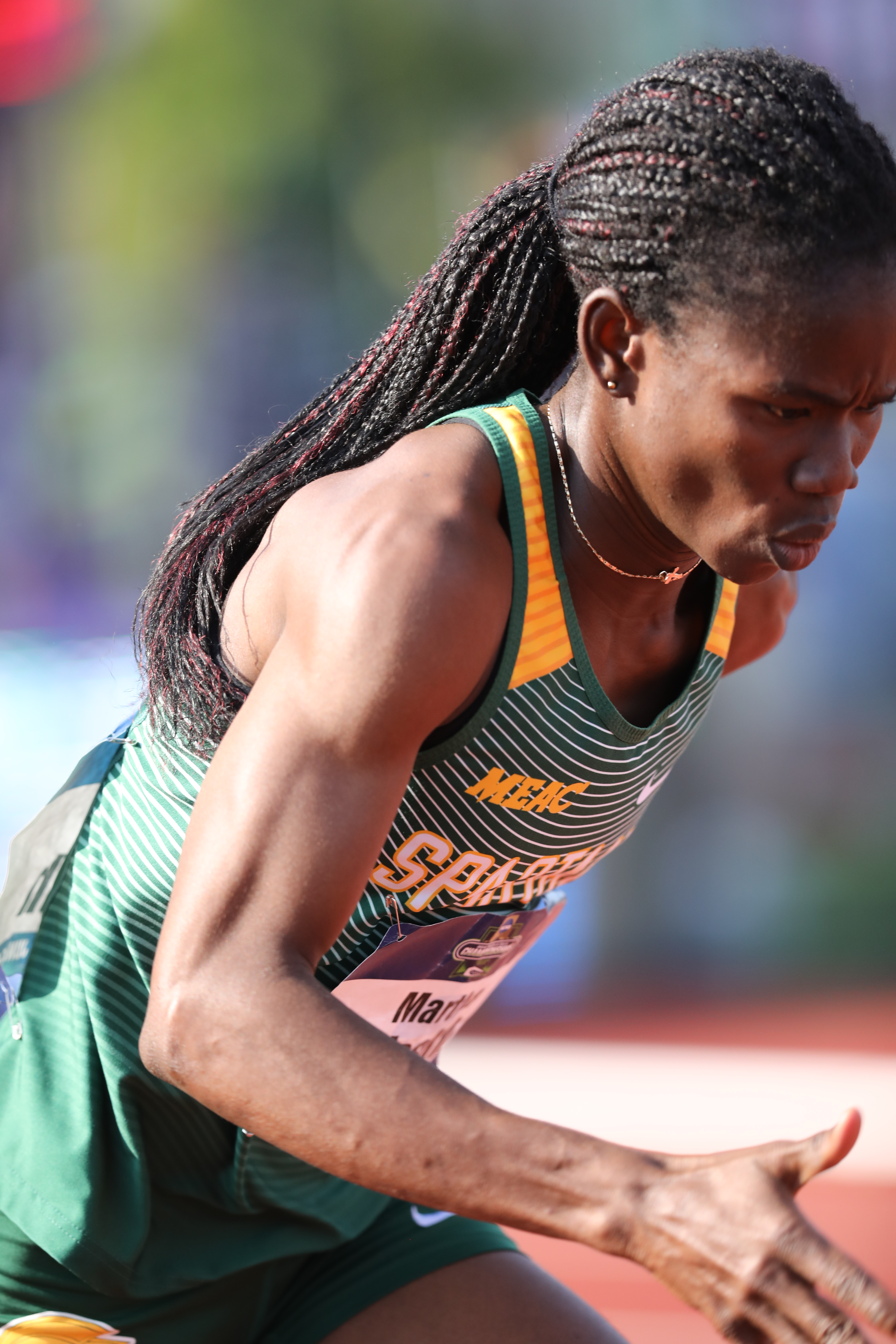
- Martha during the 2018 NCAA Division I Outdoor Track and Field Championships

Personal information
- Born: 24 August 1997 (age 28)
- Education: Norfolk State University

Sport
- Sport: Track and field
- Event(s): 400 metres, 800 metres
- College team: Norfolk State Spartans
Medal record
Women's Athletics
Representing Ghana
Summer Youth Olympics
Gold medal – first place	2014 Nanjing	800 metres

Martha Bissah (born 24 August 1997) is a Ghanaian athlete. She won a gold medal in the girls' 800m race at the 2014 Summer Youth Olympics in a time of 2:04.90.

== Education ==
Bissah attended Aduman Senior High School in the Ashanti Region of Ghana. In December 2020, she completed a degree in business with emphasis in Management at the Norfolk State University in the United States. In May 2021, she graduated with a second degree in General Business/Marketing at Norfolk State University.

== Career ==
In 2014, Bissah won a gold medal in the girls' 800m race at the 2014 Summer Youth Olympics.

Bissah was banned indefinitely by the Ghana Athletics Association in June 2016.

In February 2017, she won four gold medals at the Mid-Eastern Athletic Conference Indoor and Track & Field Championships.

In 2018, she was named the Female Athlete of the Year for the second time at Norfolk State University.

In 2019, for the second time Martha was named the Female Athlete of the year at Norfolk State University, she got the award after registering a time of 17 minutes and 16 seconds, thereby setting a new championship record.
