= Bermuda at the 2014 Summer Youth Olympics =

- IOC code: BER
- NOC: Bermuda Olympic Association

in Nanjing
- Competitors: 7 in 4 sports
- Medals: Gold 0 Silver 0 Bronze 0 Total 0

Summer Youth Olympics appearances
- 2010; 2014; 2018; 2026

Bermuda competed at the 2014 Summer Youth Olympics, in Nanjing, China from 16 August to 28 August 2014.

== Athletics ==
Bermuda qualified three athletes.

Qualification Legend: Q=Final A (medal); qB=Final B (non-medal); qC=Final C (non-medal); qD=Final D (non-medal); qE=Final E (non-medal)

Boys
Track & road events

Athlete	Event	Heats		Final	
Athlete	Event	Result	Rank	Result	Rank
Kionje Somner	200 m	22.39	18 qC	22.28	14

Field Events

Athlete	Event	Qualification		Final	
Athlete	Event	Distance	Rank	Distance	Rank
Jah-Nhai Perinchief	High jump	2.10 PB	3 Q	2.00	8

Girls
Track & road events

Athlete	Event	Heats		Final	
Athlete	Event	Result	Rank	Result	Rank
Faheemah 'Kyrah' Scraders	800 m	2:11.27	10 qB	2:10.66	9

== Sailing ==
Bermuda qualified one boat based on its performance at the 2013 World Byte CII Championships.

Athlete	Event	Race											Net Points	Final Rank
Athlete	Event	1	2	3	4	5	6	7	8	9	10	M*	Net Points	Final Rank
Cecilia Wollmann	Girls' Byte CII	~~14~~	DNE; 31	2	5	4	4	13	CAN			13	72	10

== Swimming ==
Bermuda qualified one swimmer.

Boys

Athlete	Event	Heat		Semifinal		Final	
Athlete	Event	Time	Rank	Time	Rank	Time	Rank
Jesse Washington	100 m freestyle	53.89	34	did not advance			
Jesse Washington	100 m butterfly	59.03	23	did not advance			

== Triathlon ==
Bermuda was given two quotas to compete by the tripartite committee.

Individual

Athlete	Event	Swim (750m)	Trans 1	Bike (20 km)	Trans 2	Run (5 km)	Total Time	Rank
Tyler Smith	Boys	9:48	0:41	29:32	0:27	17:43	58:11	19
Erica Hawley	Girls	10:43	0:54	34:35	0:54	21:37	1:08:14	29

Relay

Athlete	Event	Total Times per Athlete (Swim 250m, Bike 6.6 km, Run 1.8 km)	Total Group Time	Rank
America 3 Barbara Dos Santos (BRA); Tyler Smith (BER); Giovanna Gonzalez Miranda (ESA); Jose Solorzano (VEN)	Mixed Relay	22:51; 21:04; 24:11; 22:11	1:30:17	11
World 2 Erica Hawley (BER); Boris Teddy (SOL); Serena Rendell (ZIM); Drew Williams (ZIM)	Mixed Relay	23:32; 24:05; 25:04; 22:08	1:34:49	16

== See also ==
- Bermuda at the 2014 Commonwealth Games
- Bermuda at the 2014 Winter Olympics
