= Taekwondo at the 2010 Summer Youth Olympics – Girls' 55 kg =

Taekwondo competition

The girls' 55 kg competition in taekwondo at the 2010 Summer Youth Olympics in Singapore took place on August 17. A total of 11 women competed in this event, limited to fighters whose body weight was less than 55 kilograms. Preliminaries started at 14:00, quarterfinals started at 15:22, semifinals at 18:30 and the final at 19:53. Two bronze medals were awarded at the Taekwondo competitions.

== Medalists ==
Gold	Jade Jones; Great Britain
Silver	Thanh Thao Nguyen; Vietnam
Bronze	Jennifer Ågren; Sweden
Bronze	Shafinas Abdul Rahman; Singapore

== Results ==
Legend

- PTG — Won by Points Gap
- SUP — Won by Superiority
- OT — Won on over time (Golden Point)

=== Main bracket ===
First round
Jade Jones (GBR)	7
Ruth Gbagbi (CIV)	3
Kaburee Ioane (KIR)
Michele Dorkenoo (TOG)	RSC 2; 1:16
Sara Neves Bolivar (STP)	KO 1; 0:58
Thanh Thao Nguyen (VIE)

Quarterfinals
Monica Chavez (MEX)	4
Jade Jones (GBR)	7
Ndeye Coumba Diop (SEN)	DSQ
Jennifer Ågren (SWE)
Shafinas Abdul Rahman (SIN)
Kaburee Ioane (KIR)	RSC 1; 0:59
Thanh Thao Nguyen (VIE)	3
Rahma Ben Ali (TUN)	1

Semifinals
Jade Jones (GBR)	4
Jennifer Ågren (SWE)	0
Shafinas Abdul Rahman (SIN)	8
Thanh Thao Nguyen (VIE)	9

Final
Jade Jones (GBR)	9
Thanh Thao Nguyen (VIE)	6
