= Athletics at the 2026 Summer Youth Olympics – Men's 3000 metres =

Athletics event at the 2026 Summer Youth Olympics

Men's 3000 metres at the IV Summer Youth Olympic Games
- Venue: Complexe Iba Mar Diop
- Date: 8 November
- Competitors: 12 from 12 nations
- Winning time: 8:07.69

Medalists
1st place, gold medalist(s)		Enock Tuitoek	Kenya
2nd place, silver medalist(s)		Goytom Mekonen	Ethiopia
3rd place, bronze medalist(s)		Meziane Benhammou	France

The men's 3000 metres event at the 2026 Summer Youth Olympics was held on 8 November at the Complexe Iba Mar Diop in Dakar, Senegal. Kenya's Enock Tuitoek won in a time of 8:07.69.

== Schedule ==
All times are local (West Africa Time, UTC+0).

Date	Time	Round
8 November 2026	15:41	Final
8 November 2026	17:08	Victory ceremony

== Results ==
=== Final ===
The final was held on 8 November at 15:41.

Rank	Athlete	Nation	Time	Remark
1st place, gold medalist(s)	Enock Tuitoek	Kenya	8:07.69	
2nd place, silver medalist(s)	Goytom Mekonen	Ethiopia	8:08.24	PB
3rd place, bronze medalist(s)	Meziane Benhammou	France	8:11.59	
4	Samuel Niguse	Eritrea	8:14.89	PB
5	Pedro Jaramillo Salinas	Mexico	8:18.41	PB
6	Kalid Ahmed Miguil	Djibouti	8:20.97	PB
7	Cheng-Yu Wang	Chinese Taipei	8:22.16	PB
8	Abdallah Khabez	Algeria	8:22.30	PB
9	Magne Lippert	Denmark	9:08.40	
10	Liviu Vasilica Isache	Romania	9:16.66	
11	Pema Yoezer	Bhutan	9:33.73	PB
12	Katiso Liau	Lesotho	9:49.65	PB
