= Breaking at the 2026 Summer Youth Olympics – B-Boys =

Breaking event at the 2026 Summer Youth Olympics

B-Boys at the IV Summer Youth Olympic Games
- Venue: Complexe Tour de l'Œuf
- Dates: 12–13 November 2026
- Competitors: 12 from 12 nations

Medalists
1st place, gold medalist(s)		Cui Shengyu (Holy Rain)	China
2nd place, silver medalist(s)		Lin Yong-yue (Saturn)	Chinese Taipei
3rd place, bronze medalist(s)		Heorhi Salavei (Gera)	Belarus

The B-Boys breaking event at the 2026 Summer Youth Olympics was held at the Complexe Tour de l'Œuf in Dakar, Senegal, on 12 and 13 November 2026. Twelve athletes from twelve nations competed in the event.

== Schedule ==
All times are local time (UTC+0).

Date	Time	Event
12 November 2026	15:00	Pre-selection
12 November 2026	15:31	Round robin
13 November 2026	10:29	Quarter-finals
13 November 2026	11:15	Semi-finals
13 November 2026	11:40	Bronze medal battle
13 November 2026	11:57	Gold medal battle

== Competition format ==
The competition began with a pre-selection in which all twelve athletes performed individually and received scores from the judges. The results determined the seeding for the round-robin stage.

The athletes were divided into three groups of four according to their pre-selection ranking. Group A consisted of athletes ranked 1, 6, 7 and 12; Group B consisted of athletes ranked 2, 5, 8 and 11; and Group C consisted of athletes ranked 3, 4, 9 and 10.

Each athlete competed against the other three athletes in their group. Each round-robin battle consisted of two rounds.

The top two athletes from each group and the two best third-placed athletes advanced to the quarter-finals. The remaining athletes were ranked ninth to twelfth.

The knockout stage consisted of quarter-finals, semi-finals, a bronze medal battle and a gold medal battle. Each knockout battle consisted of three rounds.

== Results ==
=== Pre-selection ===
Pre-selection results
Rank	Breaker	Nickname	Nation	Score
1	Cui Shengyu	Holy Rain	China	81.4
2	Szymon Dmoch	Littleman	Poland	76.8
3	Lin Yong-yue	Saturn	Chinese Taipei	76.6
4	Edgars Surtis	Edgar	Latvia	73.9
5	Hans Stokkebroe	Ill Will	Denmark	73.6
6	Bilel Feraouche	Bilel	Morocco	70.9
7	David Kitoyan	David	Netherlands	70.5
8	Heorhi Salavei	Gera	Belarus	69.7
9	Sunny Lin	Sunny	Hong Kong	69.6
10	Leonardo Casula	Leo	Italy	69.3
11	Brayan Pérez	Lil Machine	Colombia	60.5
12	Seny Dieme	Papis	Senegal	55.8

=== Round robin ===
==== Group A ====
Group A standings
Rank	Breaker (seed)	Nickname	Rounds	Votes	Qualified
1	Cui Shengyu (CHN) (1)	Holy Rain	6	52	Q
2	Bilel Feraouche (MAR) (6)	Bilel	4	32	Q
3	David Kitoyan (NED) (7)	David	2	23	Q
4	Seny Dieme (SEN) (12)	Papis	0	1	

Match	Red Side	Score	Blue Side	Round 1	Round 2	Total Votes	Report
1	Holy Rain (China)	2–0	(Morocco) Bilel	9–0	9–0	18–0	Report
2	Papis (Senegal)	0–2	(Netherlands) David	0–9	0–9	0–18	Report
3	David (Netherlands)	0–2	(China) Holy Rain	1–8	1–8	2–16	Report
4	Papis (Senegal)	0–2	(Morocco) Bilel	1–8	0–9	1–17	Report
5	Holy Rain (China)	2–0	(Senegal) Papis	9–0	9–0	18–0	Report
6	Bilel (Morocco)	2–0	(Netherlands) David	8–1	7–2	15–3	Report

==== Group B ====
Group B standings
Rank	Breaker (seed)	Nickname	Rounds	Votes	Qualified
1	Szymon Dmoch (POL) (2)	Littleman	6	43	Q
2	Heorhi Salavei (BLR) (8)	Gera	4	39	Q
3	Hans Stokkebroe (DEN) (5)	Ill Will	2	26	Q
4	Brayen Pérez (COL) (11)	Lil Machine	0	0	

Match	Red Side	Score	Blue Side	Round 1	Round 2	Total Votes	Report
1	Littleman (Poland)	2–0	(Denmark) Ill Will	6–3	8–1	14–4	Report
2	Gera (Belarus)	2–0	(Colombia) Lil Machine	9–0	9–0	18–0	Report
3	Littleman (Poland)	2–0	(Belarus) Gera	5–4	6–3	11–7	Report
4	Ill Will (Denmark)	2–0	(Colombia) Lil Machine	9–0	9–0	18–0	Report
5	Lil Machine (Colombia)	0–2	(Poland) Littleman	0–9	0–9	0–18	Report
6	Ill Will (Denmark)	0–2	(Belarus) Gera	1–8	3–6	4–14	Report

==== Group C ====
Group C standings
Rank	Breaker (seed)	Nickname	Rounds	Votes	Qualified
1	Lin Yong-yue (TPE) (3)	Saturn	6	53	Q
2	Leonardo Casula (ITA) (10)	Leo	2	19	Q
3	Edgars Surtis (LAT) (4)	Edgar	2	18	
4	Sunny Lin (HKG) (9)	Sunny	2	18	

Match	Red Side	Score	Blue Side	Round 1	Round 2	Total Votes	Report
1	Edgar (Latvia)	0–2	(Chinese Taipei) Saturn	1–8	0–9	1–17	Report
2	Sunny (Hong Kong)	1–1	(Italy) Leo	6–3	3–6	9–9	Report
3	Saturn (Chinese Taipei)	2–0	(Hong Kong) Sunny	9–0	9–0	18–0	Report
4	Leo (Italy)	1–1	(Latvia) Edgar	3–6	7–2	10–8	Report
5	Leo (Italy)	0–2	(Chinese Taipei) Saturn	0–9	0–9	0–18	Report
6	Sunny (Hong Kong)	1–1	(Latvia) Edgar	6–3	3–6	9–9	Report

=== Knockout stage ===
The top two breakdancers from each group and the two best third-placed breakdancers advanced to the quarter-finals. The two best third-placed breakdancers were David and Ill Will.

Quarter-finals
A1	Holy Rain (CHN)	9	9	9
B3	Ill Will (DEN)	0	0	0
B2	Gera (BLR)	6	6	8
C2	Leo (ITA)	3	3	1
C1	Saturn (TPE)	6	8	9
A2	Bilel (MAR)	3	1	0
B1	Littleman (POL)	9	9	8
A3	David (NED)	0	0	1

Semi-finals
A1	Holy Rain (CHN)	8	7	9
B2	Gera (BLR)	1	2	0
C1	Saturn (TPE)	7	9	9
B1	Littleman (POL)	2	0	0

Gold medal battle
A1	Holy Rain (CHN)	5	9	7
C1	Saturn (TPE)	4	0	2
Bronze medal battle
B2	Gera (BLR)	6	4	6
B1	Littleman (POL)	3	5	3

=== Final classification ===
Rank	Breaker	Nickname	Nation
1	Cui Shengyu	Holy Rain	China
2	Lin Yong-yue	Saturn	Chinese Taipei
3	Heorhi Salavei	Gera	Belarus
4	Szymon Dmoch	Littleman	Poland
5	Leonardo Casula	Leo	Italy
6	Bilel Feraouche	Bilel	Morocco
7	David Kitoyan	David	Netherlands
8	Hans Stokkebroe	Ill Will	Denmark
9	Edgars Surtis	Edgar	Latvia
10	Sunny Lin	Sunny	Hong Kong
11	Seny Dieme	Papis	Senegal
12	Brayan Pérez	Lil Machine	Colombia

== See also ==
- Breaking at the 2026 Summer Youth Olympics – B-Girls
