= The Gambia at the 2010 Summer Youth Olympics =

- IOC code: GAM
- NOC: Gambia National Olympic Committee

in Singapore
- Competitors: 4 in 1 sport
- Flag bearer: Fatou Sowe
- Medals: Gold 0 Silver 0 Bronze 0 Total 0

Summer Youth Olympics appearances
- 2010; 2014; 2018

'The Gambia participated in the 2010 Summer Youth Olympics in Singapore.

== Athletics ==
=== Boys ===
Track and Road Events

Athletes	Event	Qualification		Final	
Athletes	Event	Result	Rank	Result	Rank
Ousman Gibba	Boys’ 200m	22.09	10 qB	22.16	11
Omar Ceesay	Boys’ 400m	52.09	18 qC	50.07	16

=== Girls ===
Track and Road Events

Athletes	Event	Qualification		Final	
Athletes	Event	Result	Rank	Result	Rank
Fatou Sowe	Girls’ 100m	12.73	17 qC	12.52	15
Binta Jatta	Girls’ 200m	27.38	15 qC	26.45	15
