= Bahrain at the 2010 Summer Youth Olympics =

- IOC code: BRN
- NOC: Bahrain Olympic Committee

in Singapore
- Competitors: 4 in 2 sports
- Flag bearer: Ebrahim Adbulhameed Ahmed
- Medals: Gold 0 Silver 0 Bronze 0 Total 0

Summer Youth Olympics appearances
- 2010; 2014; 2018

Bahrain participated in the 2010 Summer Youth Olympics in Singapore.

The Bahraini squad consisted of 4 athletes competing in 2 sports: athletics and taekwondo.

== Athletics ==
=== Boys ===
Track and Road Events

Athlete	Events	Qualifying Round		Final	
Athlete	Events	Result	Rank	Result	Rank
Ali Omar Abdulla Al Doseri	Boys' 100m	DSQ qE		11.48	28th
Faisal Jasim Mohammed Mohamed	Boys' 200m	23.19	20th qC	DNS	

== Taekwondo ==
Athlete	Event	Preliminary	Quarterfinal	Semifinal	Final	Rank
Ebrahim Ahmed	Boys' -55kg	(Colombia) Óscar Muñoz; L 7—10	Did not advance			9th
Sara Sadeq	Girls' -44kg		(Ukraine) Iryna Romoldanova; L RSC R1 0:16	Did not advance		5th
