= Athletics at the 2010 Summer Youth Olympics – Girls' 400 metre hurdles =

Athletics – Girls' 400 metres hurdles at the I Summer Youth Olympic Games
- Venue: Bishan Stadium
- Date: August 19–23
- Competitors: 16 from 16 nations

Medalists
| 1st place, gold medalist(s) | | Aurélie Chaboudez | France |
| 2nd place, silver medalist(s) | | Stina Troest | Denmark |
| 3rd place, bronze medalist(s) | | Olena Kolesnychenko | Ukraine |

The girls' 400 metres hurdles event at the 2010 Youth Olympic Games was held on 19–23 August 2010 in Bishan Stadium.

== Schedule ==
| Date | Time | Round |
|---|---|---|
| 19 August 2010 | 09:50 | Heats |
| 23 August 2010 | 10:38 | Final |

== Results ==
=== Heats ===
| Rank | Heat | Lane | Athlete | Time | Notes | Q |
|---|---|---|---|---|---|---|
| 1 | 2 | 6 | Aurélie Chaboudez (FRA) | 59.26 | PB | FA |
| 2 | 2 | 5 | Stina Troest (DEN) | 59.35 | PB | FA |
| 3 | 1 | 4 | Amber Bryant Brock (USA) | 59.46 | PB | FA |
| 4 | 1 | 6 | Olena Kolesnychenko (UKR) | 59.58 | | FA |
| 5 | 2 | 3 | Gabriela Cumberbatch (TRI) | 59.90 | | FA |
| 6 | 1 | 5 | Brittany Lewis (CAN) | 1:00.16 | SB | FA |
| 7 | 2 | 4 | Marusa Mismas (SLO) | 1:00.54 | PB | FA |
| 8 | 1 | 2 | Natania Habitzreiter (BRA) | 1:01.46 | | FA |
| 9 | 2 | 1 | Marina Zaiko (KAZ) | 1:01.88 | PB | FB |
| 10 | 2 | 8 | Nikola Rehounkova (CZE) | 1:02.81 | | FB |
| 11 | 1 | 1 | Abir Barkaoui (TUN) | 1:03.48 | | FB |
| 12 | 1 | 7 | Belen Casetta (ARG) | 1:04.58 | | FB |
| 13 | 1 | 3 | Abi Fitzpatrick (GBR) | 1:05.87 | | FB |
| 14 | 2 | 2 | Tarikah Warner (IVB) | 1:07.99 | | FB |
| | 1 | 8 | Maziah Mahusin (BRU) | DSQ | | FB |
| | 2 | 7 | Tasabih Elsayed (SUD) | DSQ | | FB |

=== Finals ===
==== Final B ====
| Rank | Lane | Athlete | Time | Notes |
|---|---|---|---|---|
| 1 | 1 | Tasabih Elsayed (SUD) | 1:01.13 | |
| 2 | 4 | Nikola Rehounkova (CZE) | 1:01.35 | PB |
| 3 | 5 | Marina Zaiko (KAZ) | 1:01.42 | PB |
| 4 | 6 | Abir Barkaoui (TUN) | 1:03.90 | |
| 5 | 3 | Belen Casetta (ARG) | 1:04.34 | |
| 6 | 8 | Abi Fitzpatrick (GBR) | 1:05.61 | |
| 7 | 7 | Tarikah Warner (IVB) | 1:07.25 | |
| 8 | 2 | Maziah Mahusin (BRU) | 1:10.56 | |

==== Final A ====
| Rank | Lane | Athlete | Time | Notes |
|---|---|---|---|---|
| 1st place, gold medalist(s) | 5 | Aurélie Chaboudez (FRA) | 58.41 | PB |
| 2nd place, silver medalist(s) | 6 | Stina Troest (DEN) | 58.88 | PB |
| 3rd place, bronze medalist(s) | 3 | Olena Kolesnychenko (UKR) | 59.25 | |
| 4 | 7 | Brittany Lewis (CAN) | 59.86 | |
| 5 | 2 | Maruša Mišmaš (SLO) | 1:00.69 | |
| 6 | 4 | Amber Bryant Brock (USA) | 1:00.72 | |
| 7 | 8 | Gabriela Cumberbatch (TRI) | 1:01.93 | |
| 8 | 1 | Natania Habitzreiter (BRA) | 1:02.44 | |
