= Athletics at the 2010 Summer Youth Olympics – Girls' 100 metres =

Athletics – Girls' 100 metres at the I Summer Youth Olympic Games
- Venue: Bishan Stadium
- Date: August 18–21
- Competitors: 36 from 36 nations

Medalists
1st place, gold medalist(s)		Josephine Omaka	Nigeria
2nd place, silver medalist(s)		Myasia Jacobs	United States
3rd place, bronze medalist(s)		Fany Chalas	Dominican Republic

The girls' 100 metres event at the 2010 Youth Olympic Games was held on 18–21 August 2010 in Bishan Stadium.

== Schedule ==
Date	Time	Round
18 August 2010	10:45	Heats
21 August 2010	10:20	Final

== Results ==
=== Heats ===
Rank	Heat	Lane	Athlete	Time	Notes	Q
1	3	7	Fany Chalas (DOM)	11.70		FA
2	1	3	Myasia Jacobs (USA)	11.74		FA
3	4	6	Annie Tagoe (GBR)	11.78		FA
4	5	4	Josephine Omaka (NGR)	11.82		FA
5	3	4	Anasztazia Nguyen (HUN)	11.89		FA
6	1	6	Rebekka Haase (GER)	11.90		FA
7	3	3	Jessica dos Reis (BRA)	11.95		FA
8	1	8	Darnetia Robinson (IVB)	12.04		FA
9	2	8	Ramona van der Vloot (SUR)	12.14		FB
10	5	5	Ching-Hsien Liao (TPE)	12.18		FB
11	2	6	Lisneidy Ines Cordova (CUB)	12.22		FB
12	4	7	Marva Etienne (BAH)	12.34		FB
13	2	5	Shai-Anne Davis (CAN)	12.46		FB
14	4	4	Macarena Borie (CHI)	12.52		FB
15	1	5	Odinakachukwa Miller (SKN)	12.59		FB
16	4	3	Ana Rosianu (ROU)	12.69		FC
17	5	6	Fatou Sowe (GAM)	12.73		FC
18	2	3	Wei Liang (SIN)	12.79		FC
19	1	1	Shantal Rouse (VIN)	12.85		FC
20	2	4	Diana Khubeseryan (ARM)	13.03		FC
21	4	2	Lovelite Detenamo (NRU)	13.04		FC
22	2	7	Merveille Mezame-Egeindita (CGO)	13.11		FC
22	4	8	Tamara Vella (MLT)	13.11	PB	FD
24	3	5	Hawa Diarra (MLI)	13.15		FD
25	5	2	Ariane Amouro (BEN)	13.45		FD
26	1	7	Melika Kasumovic (BIH)	13.48		FD
27	1	2	Rubie Gabriel (PLW)	13.57	PB	FD
28	3	2	Sanelisiwe Tsabedze (SWZ)	13.60		FD
29	5	7	Queenela Jackson (LBR)	13.64		FD
30	1	4	Madel Pilar Loheto Cofi (GEQ)	13.83		FE
30	3	8	Ahmed Mohamed Fahame (COM)	13.83		FE
32	5	3	Leanne Murray (BIZ)	14.24		FE
33	5	8	Shinoona Al Habsi (OMA)	14.29		FE
34	4	5	Tio Etita (KIR)	14.59	SB	FE
35	2	2	Chalita Lopes (GBS)	15.26		FE
	3	6	Jessica Oyane Tome Mbouissou (GAB)	DSQ		FE

=== Finals ===
==== Final E ====
wind: –0.2 m/s

Rank	Lane	Athlete	Time	Notes
1	2	Jessica Oyane Tome Mbouissou (GAB)	13.18	
2	4	Madel Pilar Loheto Cofi (GEQ)	13.71	
3	3	Leanne Murray (BIZ)	13.83	
4	6	Ahmed Mohamed Fahame (COM)	13.95	
5	8	Tio Etita (KIR)	14.43	SB
6	7	Chalita Lopes (GBS)	15.03	
	5	Shinoona Al Habsi (OMA)	DNS	

==== Final D ====
wind: –0.8 m/s

Rank	Lane	Athlete	Time	Notes
1	6	Hawa Diarra (MLI)	13.16	
2	4	Tamara Vella (MLT)	13.16	
3	5	Ariane Amouro (BEN)	13.48	
4	8	Sanelisiwe Tsabedze (SWZ)	13.50	
5	2	Queenela Jackson (LBR)	13.63	
6	7	Rubie Gabriel (PLW)	13.77	
7	3	Melika Kasumovic (BIH)	13.86	

==== Final C ====
wind: –0.3 m/s

Rank	Lane	Athlete	Time	Notes
1	4	Fatou Sowe (GAM)	12.52	
2	5	Ana Rosianu (ROU)	12.53	
3	3	Wei Liang (SIN)	12.85	
4	7	Diana Khubeseryan (ARM)	12.95	
5	6	Shantal Rouse (VIN)	13.03	
6	2	Merveille Mezame-Egeindita (CGO)	13.10	
	8	Lovelite Detenamo (NRU)	DNS	

==== Final B ====
wind: –0.4 m/s

Rank	Lane	Athlete	Time	Notes
1	6	Ching-Hsien Liao (TPE)	11.88	PB
2	3	Ramona van der Vloot (SUR)	12.15	
3	4	Lisneidy Ines Cordova (CUB)	12.15	
4	7	Shai-Anne Davis (CAN)	12.35	
5	8	Macarena Borie (CHI)	12.41	
6	2	Odinakachukwa Miller (SKN)	12.64	
	5	Marva Etienne (BAH)	DNS	

==== Final A ====
wind: +0.2 m/s

Rank	Lane	Athlete	Time	Notes
1st place, gold medalist(s)	4	Josephine Omaka (NGR)	11.58	
2nd place, silver medalist(s)	6	Myasia Jacobs (USA)	11.64	
3rd place, bronze medalist(s)	5	Fany Chalas (DOM)	11.65	SB
4	3	Annie Tagoe (GBR)	11.73	
5	7	Anasztazia Nguyen (HUN)	11.81	
6	2	Jessica dos Reis (BRA)	11.94	=PB
7	1	Darnetia Robinson (IVB)	12.06	
8	8	Rebekka Haase (GER)	12.08	
