= Papua New Guinea at the 2026 Summer Youth Olympics =

- Flag of Papua New Guinea
- IOC code: PNG
- NOC: Papua New Guinea Olympic Committee

in Dakar, Senegal October 31, 2026 – November 13, 2026
- Competitors: 2 in 2 sports
- Flag bearers: Kabake Lansana & Roxanne Kirarock
- Medals: Gold 0 Silver 0 Bronze 0 Total 0

Summer Youth Olympics appearances
- 2010; 2014; 2018; 2026

Papua New Guinea is scheduled to compete at the 2026 Summer Youth Olympics in Dakar, Senegal from October 31 to November 13, 2026. This will mark Papua New Guinea's fourth appearance at the Youth Olympics, after making its debut in 2010.

Athlete Kabake Lansana and swimmer Roxanne Kirarock served as the flag bearers for the opening ceremony.

== Competitors ==
The following is the list of number of competitors participating at the Games per sport/discipline.

Sport	Men	Women	Total
Athletics	1	0	1
Swimming	0	1	1
Total	1	1	2

== Athletics ==
Papua New Guinea entered one male athlete.

Track events

Athlete	Event	Heat		Final	
Athlete	Event	Result	Rank	Result	Rank
Kabake Lansana	Men's 100 metres	10.99 PB	3 Q	10.91 PB	6

== Swimming ==
Papua New Guinea entered one female swimmer.

Athlete	Event	Heat		Final	
Athlete	Event	Time	Rank	Time	Rank
Roxanne Kirarock	Women's 50 m freestyle				
Roxanne Kirarock	Women's 100 m freestyle				
Roxanne Kirarock	Women's 50 m breaststroke				
Roxanne Kirarock	Women's 100 m breaststroke				
