= Athletics at the 2014 Summer Youth Olympics – Girls' 800 metres =

Athletics – Girls' 800 metres at the II Summer Youth Olympic Games
- Venue: Nanjing Olympic Sports Centre
- Date: August 20–23
- Competitors: 24 from 24 nations

Medalists
1st place, gold medalist(s)		Martha Bissah	Ghana
2nd place, silver medalist(s)		Hawi Alemu Negeri	Ethiopia
3rd place, bronze medalist(s)		Mareen Kalis	Germany

The girls’ 800 m competition at the 2014 Summer Youth Olympics was held on 20–23 August 2014 in Nanjing Olympic Sports Center.

== Schedule ==
Date	Time	Round
20 August 2014	21:15	Heats
23 August 2014	21:45	Final

== Results ==
=== Heats ===
Eight fastest athletes advanced to Final A, the others advanced to Final B, or C according to their times.

Rank	Heat	Lane	Athlete	Result	Notes	Q
1	1	3	Mareen Kalis (GER)	2:05.67	PB	FA
2	3	4	Martha Bissah (GHA)	2:07.67		FA
3	3	7	Hawi Alemu (ETH)	2:08.18		FA
4	2	7	Elena Bellò (ITA)	2:08.99		FA
5	3	3	Ekaterina Alekseeva (RUS)	2:09.32	SB	FA
6	1	7	Louise Shanahan (IRL)	2:09.58	SB	FA
7	3	8	Hina Takahashi (JPN)	2:09.59		FA
8	1	8	Lotte Scheldeman (BEL)	2:09.94		FA
9	2	6	Agnes Mulee Ngovi (KEN)	2:10.26		FB
10	2	9	Faheemah Scraders (BER)	2:11.27		FB
11	2	3	Ana Carolyne Silva (BRA)	2:11.29		FB
12	1	2	Alina Tape (AUS)	2:11.36		FB
13	2	5	Celia Antón (ESP)	2:11.48		FB
14	3	9	Thandi Uerimuna (BOT)	2:11.97	PB	FB
15	1	5	Junelle Bromfield (JAM)	2:13.22		FB
16	3	6	Maryna Duts (UKR)	2:13.76		FB
17	2	8	Lakeisha Warner (IVB)	2:18.67		FC
18	1	4	Sara Joe Kortbawi (LIB)	2:19.42	SB	FC
19	3	2	Dhakirina Fatima (COM)	2:28.17	SB	FC
20	1	6	Hanin Thabit (YEM)	2:40.29		FC
21	2	2	Mary Linda Alexander (FSM)	2:56.34		FC
	3	5	Yahoska Espinales (NCA)	DNF		FC
	2	4	Maimouna Cissé (MTN)	DSQ		FC
	1	9	Mariama Mamoudou (NIG)	DNS		

=== Finals ===
==== Final A ====
Rank	Final Placing	Lane	Athlete	Result	Notes
1st place, gold medalist(s)	1	5	Martha Bissah (GHA)	2:04.90	PB
2nd place, silver medalist(s)	2	6	Hawi Alemu (ETH)	2:06.01	PB
3rd place, bronze medalist(s)	3	7	Mareen Kalis (GER)	2:06.03	
4	4	4	Elena Bellò (ITA)	2:06.31	PB
5	5	2	Lotte Scheldeman (BEL)	2:07.83	
6	6	8	Louise Shanahan (IRL)	2:08.29	PB
7	7	9	Ekaterina Alekseeva (RUS)	2:09.21	SB
8	8	3	Hina Takahashi (JPN)	2:09.96	

==== Final B ====
Rank	Final Placing	Lane	Athlete	Result	Notes
1	9	7	Faheemah Scraders (BER)	2:10.66	SB
2	10	8	Celia Antón (ESP)	2:11.12	
3	11	6	Ana Carolyne Silva (BRA)	2:11.27	
4	12	2	Maryna Duts (UKR)	2:12.13	=PB
5	13	9	Thandi Uerimuna (BOT)	2:12.13	
6	14	4	Alina Tape (AUS)	2:12.57	
7	15	3	Junelle Bromfield (JAM)	2:13.01	
		5	Agnes Mulee Ngovi (KEN)	DNS	

==== Final C ====
Rank	Final Placing	Lane	Athlete	Result	Notes
1	16	5	Lakeisha Warner (IVB)	2:16.71	
2	17	6	Sara Joe Kortbawi (LIB)	2:17.62	PB
3	18	4	Dhakirina Fatima (COM)	2:26.30	PB
4	19	3	Hanin Thabit (YEM)	2:38.61	
		7	Mary Linda Alexander (FSM)	DNS	
		8	Yahoska Espinales (NCA)	DNS	
		2	Maimouna Cissé (MTN)	DNS	
