= Bermuda at the 2018 Summer Youth Olympics =

- IOC code: BER
- NOC: Bermuda Olympic Association
- Website: www.olympics.bm

in Buenos Aires, Argentina 6 – 18 October 2018
- Competitors: 3 in 2 sports
- Flag bearer: Madelyn Moore
- Medals: Gold 0 Silver 0 Bronze 0 Total 0

Summer Youth Olympics appearances
- 2010; 2014; 2018; 2026

Bermuda participated at the 2018 Summer Youth Olympics in Buenos Aires, Argentina from 6 October to 18 October 2018.

== Athletics ==
Bermuda qualified 1 athlete.

== Swimming ==
Bermuda qualified 2 athletes.
