= Ivory Coast at the 2010 Summer Youth Olympics =

- IOC code: CIV
- NOC: Comité National Olympique de Côte d'Ivoire

in Singapore
- Competitors: 6 in 3 sports
- Flag bearer: Florence Ouattara
- Medals: Gold 0 Silver 0 Bronze 0 Total 0

Summer Youth Olympics appearances
- 2010; 2014; 2018; 2026

Côte d'Ivoire participated at the 2010 Summer Youth Olympics in Singapore.

== Athletics ==
=== Boys ===
Track and road events

Athletes	Event	Qualification		Final	
Athletes	Event	Result	Rank	Result	Rank
Isaac Gbadegesin	Boys' 200m	23.07	19 qC	23.05	17

== Basketball ==
Girls

Squad List	Event	Group Stage		Placement Stage			Rank
Squad List	Event	Group A	Rank	9th-16th	13th-16th	15th-16th	Rank
Sarah Name Anicette Boni; K. Florence Ouattara (C); Fatou Yasmine Bamba; T. Massandje Camara	Girls' Basketball	Russia; L 6-16	4	Belarus; L 7-33	Mali; L 13-17	Angola; W 15-13	15
Sarah Name Anicette Boni; K. Florence Ouattara (C); Fatou Yasmine Bamba; T. Massandje Camara	Girls' Basketball	Vanuatu; W 22-19	4	Belarus; L 7-33	Mali; L 13-17	Angola; W 15-13	15
Sarah Name Anicette Boni; K. Florence Ouattara (C); Fatou Yasmine Bamba; T. Massandje Camara	Girls' Basketball	Canada; L 12-25	4	Belarus; L 7-33	Mali; L 13-17	Angola; W 15-13	15
Sarah Name Anicette Boni; K. Florence Ouattara (C); Fatou Yasmine Bamba; T. Massandje Camara	Girls' Basketball	South Korea; L 15-22	4	Belarus; L 7-33	Mali; L 13-17	Angola; W 15-13	15

== Taekwondo ==
Athlete	Event	Preliminary	Quarterfinal	Semifinal	Final	Rank
Ruth Gbagbi	Girls' -55kg	Jade Jones (GBR); L 3-7	did not advance			9
