= Lebanon at the 2014 Summer Youth Olympics =

- IOC code: LIB
- NOC: Lebanese Olympic Committee
- Website: www.lebolymp.org

in Nanjing
- Competitors: 4 in 4 sports
- Medals: Gold 0 Silver 0 Bronze 0 Total 0

Summer Youth Olympics appearances
- 2010; 2014; 2018

Lebanon competed at the 2014 Summer Youth Olympics, in Nanjing, China from 16 August to 28 August 2014.

== Athletics ==
Lebanon qualified one athlete.

Qualification Legend: Q=Final A (medal); qB=Final B (non-medal); qC=Final C (non-medal); qD=Final D (non-medal); qE=Final E (non-medal)

Girls
Track & road events

Athlete	Event	Heats		Final	
Athlete	Event	Result	Rank	Result	Rank
Sara Kortbawi	800 m	2:19.42	18 qC	2:17.62	17

== Fencing ==
Lebanon was given a quota to compete by the tripartite committee.

Boys

Athlete	Event	Pool Round	Seed	Round of 16	Quarterfinals	Semifinals	Final / BM	Rank
Athlete	Event	Opposition Score	Seed	Opposition Score	Opposition Score	Opposition Score	Opposition Score	Rank
Antonie El-Choueiri	Foil	S Heroui (ALG); L 2 – 5 G Bianchi (ITA); L 1 – 5 M Seo (KOR); L 1 – 5 C Choi (HKG); L 0 – 5 M Huang (CHN); L 0 – 5 A Rzadkowski (POL); L 1 – 5	13	E Roger (FRA); L 1 – 15	did not advance			13

== Swimming ==
Lebanon qualified one swimmer.

Girls

Athlete	Event	Heat		Final	
Athlete	Event	Time	Rank	Time	Rank
Chrystelle Doueihy	400 m freestyle	4:38.30	33	did not advance	
Chrystelle Doueihy	800 m freestyle	—		9:26.26	25

== Taekwondo ==
Lebanon was given a wild card to compete.

Boys

Athlete	Event	Round of 16	Quarterfinals	Semifinals	Final	Rank
Athlete	Event	Opposition Result	Opposition Result	Opposition Result	Opposition Result	Rank
Eric Melki	−55 kg	D Endamne (GAB); W 23 (PTG) – 2	D Joo (KOR); L 9 – 18	did not advance		5
