= British Virgin Islands at the 2010 Summer Youth Olympics =

- IOC code: IVB
- NOC: British Virgin Islands Olympic Committee

in Singapore
- Competitors: 3 in 1 sport
- Flag bearer: J'Maal Alexander
- Medals: Gold 0 Silver 0 Bronze 0 Total 0

Summer Youth Olympics appearances
- 2010; 2014; 2018; 2026

The British Virgin Islands competed at the 2010 Summer Youth Olympics, the inaugural Youth Olympic Games, held in Singapore from 14 August to 26 August 2010.

== Athletics ==
=== Boys ===
Track and Road Events

Athletes	Event	Qualification		Final	
Athletes	Event	Result	Rank	Result	Rank
J'Maal Alexander	Boys’ 200m	22.97	18 qC	22.73	16

=== Girls ===
Track and Road Events

Athletes	Event	Qualification		Final	
Athletes	Event	Result	Rank	Result	Rank
Darnetia Robinson	Girls’ 100m	12.04	8 Q	12.06	7
Tarikah Warner	Girls’ 400m Hurdles	1:07.99	14 qB	1:07.25	15
