= Fiji at the 2010 Summer Youth Olympics =

- IOC code: FIJ
- NOC: Fiji Association of Sports and National Olympic Committee

in Singapore
- Competitors: 5 in 4 sports
- Flag bearer: Louise Lolohea
- Medals: Gold 0 Silver 0 Bronze 0 Total 0

Summer Youth Olympics appearances
- 2010; 2014; 2018

Fiji participated in the 2010 Summer Youth Olympics in Singapore.

The Fijian squad consisted of five athletes competing in four sports: aquatics (swimming), athletics, judo and weightlifting.

== Medalists ==
Medal	Name	Sport	Event	Date
Bronze	Lepani Naivalu	Athletics	Boy's Medley Relay	23 Aug

== Athletics ==
=== Boys ===
Track and road events

Athletes	Event	Qualification		Final	
Athletes	Event	Result	Rank	Result	Rank
Lepani Naivalu	Boys' 100m	10.94	7 Q	10.79	7
Lepani Naivalu (FIJ); John Rivan (PNG); Nicholas Hough (AUS); Raheen Williams (AUS)	Boys' Medley Relay			1:52.71	Bronze medal

== Judo ==
Individual

Athlete	Event	Round 1	Round 2	Round 3	Semifinals	Final	Rank
Athlete	Event	Opposition Result	Opposition Result	Opposition Result	Opposition Result	Opposition Result	Rank
Diau Bauro	Boys' -55 kg	BYE	Yadav (IND); L 000-110		Repechage; Takidine (COM); L 000-101	Did not advance	7

Team

Team	Event	Round 1	Round 2	Semifinals	Final	Rank
Team	Event	Opposition Result	Opposition Result	Opposition Result	Opposition Result	Rank
Chiba; Dieulourdes Joseph (HAI); Diau Bauro (FIJ); Alexandra Pop (ROU); Phuc Cai (DEN); Sophio Beridze (GEO); Rijad Dedeic (MNE); Ryosuke Igarashi (JPN)	Mixed Team	BYE	Essen; L 2-5	Did not advance		5

== Swimming ==
Athletes	Event	Heat		Semifinal		Final	
Athletes	Event	Time	Position	Time	Position	Time	Position
Tieri Erasito	Girls’ 200m Freestyle	2:21.80	40			Did not advance	
Tieri Erasito	Girls’ 200m Butterfly	2:35.59	22			Did not advance	

== Weightlifting ==
Athlete	Event	Snatch	Clean & jerk	Total	Rank
Charlie Lolohea	Boys' 69kg	78	105	183	10
Louise Lolohea	Girls' 58kg	45	57	102	9
