= British Virgin Islands at the 2014 Summer Youth Olympics =

- IOC code: IVB
- NOC: British Virgin Islands Olympic Committee

in Nanjing
- Competitors: 8 in 3 sports
- Medals: Gold 0 Silver 0 Bronze 0 Total 0

Summer Youth Olympics appearances
- 2010; 2014; 2018; 2026

The British Virgin Islands competed at the 2014 Summer Youth Olympics held in Nanjing, China from 16 August to 28 August 2014.

== Athletics ==
British Virgin Islands qualified six athletes.

Qualification Legend: Q=Final A (medal); qB=Final B (non-medal); qC=Final C (non-medal); qD=Final D (non-medal); qE=Final E (non-medal)

Boys
Track & road events

Athlete	Event	Heats		Final	
Athlete	Event	Result	Rank	Result	Rank
Kyron McMaster	400 m hurdles	DSQ qB		DSQ	

Field Events

Athlete	Event	Qualification		Final	
Athlete	Event	Distance	Rank	Distance	Rank
Akeem Bradshaw	Triple jump	14.33	13 qB	13.90	13

Girls
Track & road events

Athlete	Event	Heats		Final	
Athlete	Event	Result	Rank	Result	Rank
Nelda Huggins	100 m	11.81	6 Q	11.87	6
Lakeisha Warner	800 m	2:18.67	17 qC	2:16.71	16
Deya Erickson	100 m hurdles	14.75	18 qC	DNS	

Field events

Athlete	Event	Qualification		Final	
Athlete	Event	Distance	Position	Distance	Position
Kala Penn	Long jump	5.22	14 qB	5.19	14

== Sailing ==
British Virgin Islands qualified one boat based on its performance at the Byte CII North American & Caribbean Continental Qualifiers.

Athlete	Event	Race											Net Points	Final Rank
Athlete	Event	1	2	3	4	5	6	7	8	9	10	M*	Net Points	Final Rank
Samuel Morrell	Boys' Byte CII	24	14	25	18	12	~~28~~	19	CAN			13	125	22

== Swimming ==
British Virgin Islands qualified one swimmer.

Girls

Athlete	Event	Heat		Semifinal		Final	
Athlete	Event	Time	Rank	Time	Rank	Time	Rank
Amarah Phillip	50 m freestyle	29.28	38	did not advance			
Amarah Phillip	50 m butterfly	31.05	29	did not advance			
