= Comoros at the 2010 Summer Youth Olympics =

- IOC code: COM
- NOC: Comité Olympique et Sportif des Iles Comores

in Singapore
- Competitors: 4 in 3 sports
- Flag bearer: Ahmed Mohamed Fahame
- Medals: Gold 0 Silver 0 Bronze 0 Total 0

Summer Youth Olympics appearances
- 2010; 2014; 2018

Comoros competed at the 2010 Summer Youth Olympics in Singapore, from 14 to 26 August 2010. This marked the first time Comoros has competed at the Summer Youth Olympics.

The Comoros team consisted of 4 athletes competing in 3 sports: athletics, judo and swimming.

== Athletics ==
=== Boys ===
Track and Road Events

Athletes	Event	Qualification		Final	
Athletes	Event	Result	Rank	Result	Rank
El Hadad Houmadi	Boys' 100m	11.71	24 qC	11.74	22

=== Girls ===
Track and Road Events

Athletes	Event	Qualification		Final	
Athletes	Event	Result	Rank	Result	Rank
Ahmed Mohamed Fahame	Girls’ 100m	13.83	30 qE	13.95	31

== Judo ==
Individual

Athlete	Event	Round 1	Round 2	Round 3	Semifinals	Final	Rank
Athlete	Event	Opposition Result	Opposition Result	Opposition Result	Opposition Result	Opposition Result	Rank
Fahariya Takidine	Boys' -55 kg	BYE	Muminkhujaev (UZB); L 000-100		Repechage; Bauro (FIJ); W 101-000	Bronze-medal match Rivadulla (ESP); L 000-100	5

Team

Team	Event	Round 1	Round 2	Semifinals	Final	Rank
Team	Event	Opposition Result	Opposition Result	Opposition Result	Opposition Result	Rank
Birmingham; Fahariya Takidine (COM); Ecaterina Guica (CAN); Song Chol Hyon (PRK); Neo Kapenko (BOT); Chin Jie Lim (SIN) kadijah Maxwell (BAR); Krisztian Toth (HUN)	Mixed Team	Cairo; L 2-5	Did not advance			9

== Swimming ==
Athletes	Event	Heat		Semifinal		Final	
Athletes	Event	Time	Position	Time	Position	Time	Position
Soule Soilihi	Boys' 100m Freestyle	1:18.38	54	Did not advance			
