= Judo at the 2010 Summer Youth Olympics – Boys' 55 kg =

Judo competition

The Boys' 55 kg tournament in Judo at the 2010 Summer Youth Olympics was held on August 21 at the International Convention Centre.

This event was the lightest of the boy's judo weight classes, limiting competitors to a maximum of 55 kilograms of body mass. The tournament bracket consisted of a single-elimination contest culminating in a gold medal match. There was also a repechage to determine the winners of the two bronze medals. Each judoka who had lost before the finals competed in the repechage with the two finalists getting bronze medals.

== Medalists ==
Gold	David Pulkrabek; Czech Republic
Silver	Mansurkhuja Muminkhujaev; Uzbekistan
Bronze	Dmytro Antanov; Ukraine
Bronze	Pedro Rivadulla; Spain

== Results ==
=== Main Bracket ===
Round of 16
David Pulkrabek (CZE)	100
Fabio Basile (ITA)	000

Quarterfinals
David Pulkrabek (CZE)	020
Dmytro Atanov (UKR)	001
Pedro Rivadulla (ESP)	100
Abdulrahman Anter (YEM)	000
Fahariya Takidine (COM)	000
Mansurkhuja Muminkhujaev (UZB)	100
Diau Bauro (FIJ)	000
Subash Yadav (IND)	110

Semifinals
David Pulkrabek (CZE)	011
Pedro Rivadulla (ESP)	001
Mansurkhuja Muminkhujaev (UZB)	003
Subash Yadav (IND)	000

Finals
David Pulkrabek (CZE)	010
Mansurkhuja Muminkujaev (UZB)	001

=== Repechage ===
First round
Fabio Basile (ITA)	BYE

Second round
Fabio Basile (ITA)	111
Abdulrahman Anter (YEM)	000
Dmytro Antanov (UKR)	BYE
Diau Bauro (FIJ)	BYE
Fahariya Takidine (COM)	BYE

Third round
Fabio Basile (ITA)	000
Dmytro Atanov (UKR)	001
Diau Bauro (FIJ)	000
Fahariya Takidine (COM)	101

Bronze Medal Finals
Dmytro Antanov (UKR)	100
Subash Yadav (IND)	000
Fahariya Takidine (COM)	000
Pedro Rivadulla (ESP)	100
