= Bermuda at the 2026 Summer Youth Olympics =

- Flag of Bermuda
- IOC code: BER
- NOC: Bermuda Olympic Association
- Website: www.olympics.bm

in Dakar, Senegal October 31, 2026 – November 13, 2026
- Competitors: 4 (2 men and 2 women) in 3 sports
- Flag bearers: Maggie Mewett & Gianluca Bortoli
- Medals: Gold 0 Silver 0 Bronze 0 Total 0

Summer Youth Olympics appearances
- 2010; 2014; 2018; 2026

Bermuda is scheduled to compete at the 2026 Summer Youth Olympics in Dakar, Senegal from October 31 to November 13, 2026. This will mark Bermuda's fourth appearance at the Youth Olympics, after making its debut in 2010.

Swimmer Maggie Mewett and triathlete Gianluca Bortoli served as the flag bearers for the opening ceremony.

== Competitors ==
The following is the list of number of competitors participating at the Games per sport/discipline.

Sport	Men	Women	Total
Athletics	0	1	1
Swimming	1	1	2
Triathlon	1	0	1
Total	2	2	4

== Ahletics ==
Bermudas entered one female athlete.

Athlete	Event	Distance	Rank
Tatiana Sousa	Javelin throw		

== Swimming ==
Bermudas entered two swimmers, one male and one female.

Men

Athlete	Event	Time	Rank
Noah Maranzana	100 m freestyle		

Women

Athlete	Event	Time	Rank
Maggie Mewett	50 m butterfly		

== Triathlon ==
Bermudas entered one male athlete.

Athlete	Event	Time	Rank
Gianluca Bortoli	Men's individual		
