= Palau at the 2018 Summer Youth Olympics =

- IOC code: PLW
- NOC: Palau National Olympic Committee

in Buenos Aires, Argentina 6 – 18 October 2018
- Competitors: 2 in 1 sport
- Medals: Gold 0 Silver 0 Bronze 0 Total 0

Summer Youth Olympics appearances
- 2010; 2014; 2018

Palau participated at the 2018 Summer Youth Olympics in Buenos Aires, Argentina from 6 October to 18 October 2018.

== Swimming ==
Boys

Athlete	Event	Heat		Semifinal		Final	
Athlete	Event	Time	Rank	Time	Rank	Time	Rank
Noel Keane	100 m freestyle	55.59	40	did not advance			
Noel Keane	200 m freestyle	2:00.77	34	did not advance			

Girls

Athlete	Event	Heat		Semifinal		Final	
Athlete	Event	Time	Rank	Time	Rank	Time	Rank
Noel Keane	50 m freestyle	31.27	44	did not advance			
