= Nooa Takooa =

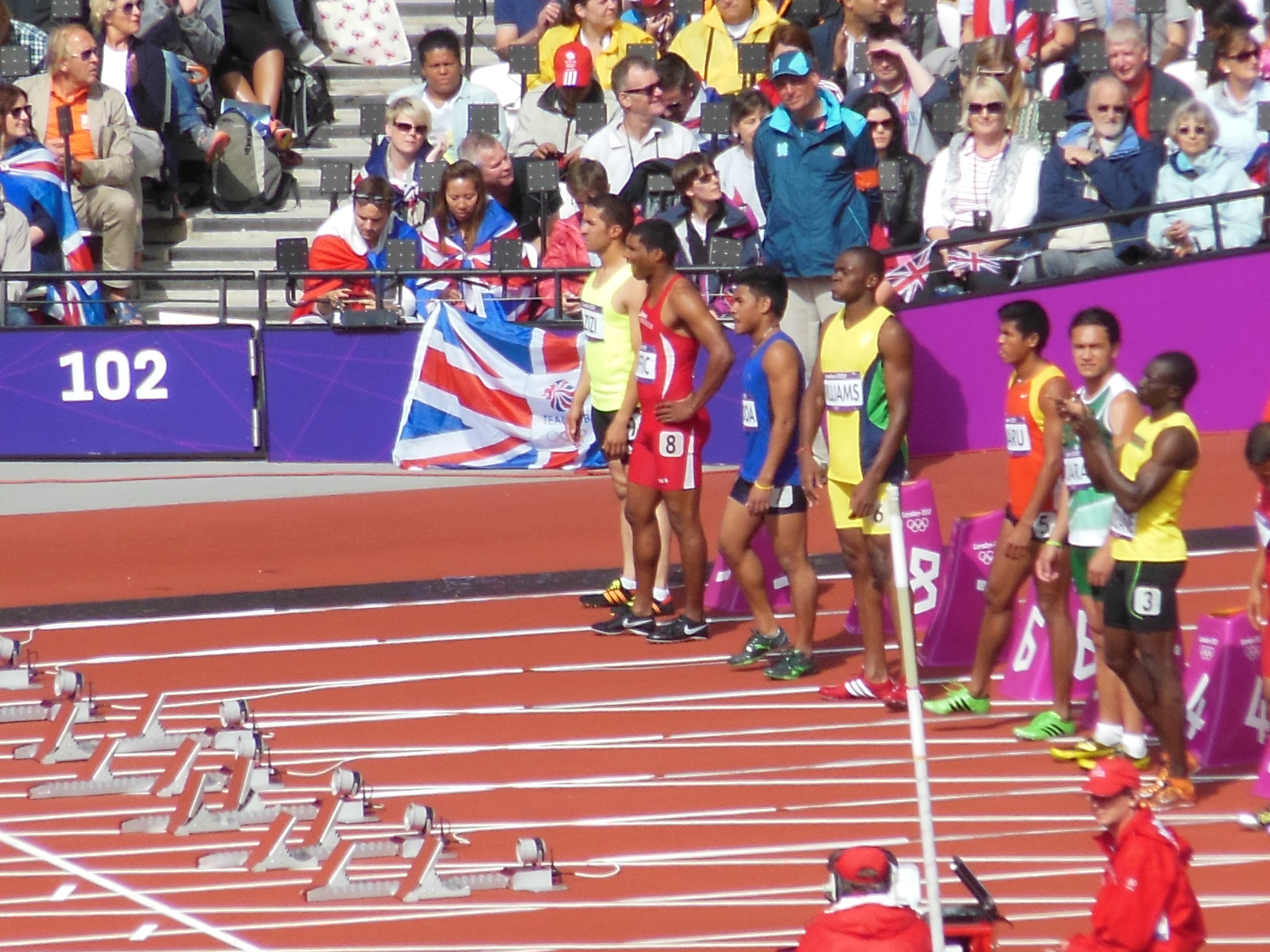
- Before the start of heat 4 of the 100 m at the 2012 Summer Olympics, Takooa in blue

Personal information
- Born: March 10, 1993 (age 33) Tarawa, Kiribati
- Height: 1.6 m (5 ft 3 in)
- Weight: 67 kg (148 lb)

Sport
- Country: Kiribati
- Sport: Athletics
- Event: 100m

Achievements and titles
- Personal best: 100m – 11.5
Medal record
Men's Athletics
Representing Kiribati
Oceania Championships
| Silver medal – second place | 2013 Papeete | 4x100 m relay |
- Updated on 16 July 2013

Nooa Takooa (born 10 March 1993) is a sprinter who is internationally representing Kiribati. He participated in 2009 World Championships in Athletics and 2010 Summer Youth Olympics. He represented Kiribati at 2012 Summer Olympics in London in the Men's 100m event. Takooa was eliminated in the preliminary round but finished with a personal best time of 11.53. Takooa is a member of the Church of Jesus Christ of Latter-day Saints.

== Personal bests ==
Outdoor

- 100 m: 11.51 s (wind: -0.1 m/s) – (French Polynesia) Papeete, 5 June 2013

Indoor

- 60 m: 7.57 s – (Turkey) Istanbul, 9 March 2012

== Achievements ==
| Year | Competition | Venue | Position | Event | Notes |
|---|---|---|---|---|---|
| 2009 | World Championships in Athletics | Berlin, Germany | 85th | 100 m | 11.74 s (wind: -0.3 m/s) |
| 2010 | Kiribati Athletics Championships | Kiribati | 3rd | 100 m | 11.5 (PB) |
| 2010 | Kiribati Athletics Championships | Kiribati | 2nd | 200 m | 23.7 |
| 2010 | Youth Olympics | Singapore City, Singapore | — | 100 m | DNS |
| 2010 | Oceania Youth Championships | Sydney, Australia | 6th (h) | 100 m | 11.85 s (wind: +0.7 m/s) |
| 2012 | World Indoor Championships | Istanbul, Turkey | 6th (h) | 60 m | 7.57 s |
| 2012 | Olympic Games | London, United Kingdom | 13th (q) | 100 m | 11.53 s (wind: +0.5 m/s) |
| 2013 | Oceania Championships | Papeete, French Polynesia | 14th (sf) | 100 m | 11.51 s (wind: -0.1 m/s) |
| 2013 | Oceania Championships | Papeete, French Polynesia | 12th (h) | 200 m | 23.86 s (wind: -1.3 m/s) |
| 2013 | Oceania Championships | Papeete, French Polynesia | 2nd | 4 × 100 m relay | 44.46 s |
| 2013 | Oceania Championships | Papeete, French Polynesia | – | High jump | NH |
| 2014 | Commonwealth Games | Glasgow, United Kingdom | 70th (h) | 100m | 11.56 (wind: +0.2 m/s) |
| 2014 | Oceania Championships | Rarotonga, Cook Islands | 15th (sf) | 100m | 11.99 (wind: -3.3 m/s) |
| 2014 | Oceania Championships | Rarotonga, Cook Islands | 11th (h) | 200m | 24.13 w (wind: +5.0 m/s) |
| 2014 | Oceania Championships | Rarotonga, Cook Islands | 7th | 4 × 100 m relay | 45.24 |
