= Swaziland at the 2010 Summer Youth Olympics =

Eswatini at the 2010 Summer Youth Olympics
- IOC code: SWZ
- NOC: Swaziland Olympic and Commonwealth Games Association

in Singapore
- Competitors: 3 in 2 sports
- Flag bearer: Mlandvo Shongwe

Summer Youth Olympics appearances
- 2010; 2014; 2018

Swaziland competed in the 2010 Summer Youth Olympics which were held in Singapore from August 14 to August 26, 2010.

== Athletics ==
Note: The athletes who do not have a "Q" next to their Qualification Rank advance to a non-medal ranking final.

=== Boys ===
Track and Road Events

Athletes	Event	Qualification		Final	
Athletes	Event	Result	Rank	Result	Rank
Mlandvo Shongwe	Boys’ 200m	22.24	14 qB	22.46	12

=== Girls ===
Track and Road Events

Athletes	Event	Qualification		Final	
Athletes	Event	Result	Rank	Result	Rank
Sanelisiwe Tsabedze	Girls’ 100m	13.60	28 qD	13.50	24

== Swimming ==
Girls'

Athletes	Event	Heat		Semifinal		Final	
Athletes	Event	Time	Position	Time	Position	Time	Position
Kathryn Millin	Girls' 50m Freestyle	28.50	37	did not advance			
Kathryn Millin	Girls' 50m Butterfly	30.31	18	did not advance			
