= Palau at the 2010 Summer Youth Olympics =

- IOC code: PLW
- NOC: Palau National Olympic Committee

in Singapore
- Competitors: 4 in 3 sports
- Flag bearer: Rodman Teltull
- Medals: Gold 0 Silver 0 Bronze 0 Total 0

Summer Youth Olympics appearances
- 2010; 2014; 2018

Palau participated in the 2010 Summer Youth Olympics in Singapore.

The Palau squad consisted of 4 athletes competing in 3 sports: aquatics (swimming), athletics and weightlifting.

== Athletics ==
=== Boys ===
Track and Road Events

Athletes	Event	Qualification		Final	
Athletes	Event	Result	Rank	Result	Rank
Rodman Teltull	Boys' 100m	11.71	24 qD	11.45	23

=== Girls ===
Track and Road Events

Event	Athletes	Qualification		Final	
Event	Athletes	Result	Rank	Result	Rank
Rubie Joy Gabriel	Girls' 100m	13.57	27 qD	13.77	26

== Swimming ==
Girls'

Athletes	Event	Heat		Semifinal		Final	
Athletes	Event	Time	Position	Time	Position	Time	Position
Maria Gibbons	50m freestyle	31:43	51	Did not advance			
Maria Gibbons	100m freestyle	1:11.34	51	Did not advance			

== Weightlifting ==
Boys

Athlete	Event	Snatch	Clean & Jerk	Total	Rank
Mavrick Faustino	63kg	90	110	200	8
