= Rosemary Nwankwo =

Nigerian athletics competitor (born 2009)

Chigozie Rosemary Nwankwo
Personal information
- Nationality: Nigerian
- Born: 22 September 2009 (age 17)

Sport
- Sport: Athletics
- Event: Sprinter

Achievements and titles
- Personal bests: 100 m: 11.16w (2026), 11.34 (2026); 200 m: 23.19 (2026)
Medal record
Women's athletics
Representing Nigeria
African Championships
Gold medal – first place	2026 Accra	4 × 100 metres
Youth Olympic Games
Gold medal – first place	2026 Dakar	100 m
African U18 Championships
Silver medal – second place	2025 Abeokuta	100 m
Silver medal – second place	2025 Abeokuta	200 m
Gold medal – first place	2025 Abeokuta	Medley Relay

Chigozie Rosemary Nwankwo (born 22 September 2009 ) is a Nigerian track and field athlete who specializes in sprinting. In 2026, she was a part of the Nigerian 4 × 100 m relay team that won the African Championship in 2026 in Accra. She also clinched the gold medal in the 100 metres at the Youth Olympic Games the same year.

== Career ==
She received a scholarship through the N-Youth Sports Academy to study at Nigerian Tulip International College (NTIC) in Abuja after participating in the National Youth Games. Nwankwo gained prominence representing Anambra at youth Championships before making her international debut in 2025. At the U18 African Championships in Abeokuta, she won silver medals in both the 100 and 200 metres, recording times of 11.96 seconds and 24.01 seconds, respectively. She won gold as part of he Nigerian medley relay team in the 1000 metres, with a time of 2:08.16.

At the 2026 World Athletics Relays in Gaborone, she helped secure a place for the women's 4 × 100 meter relay team at the 2027 World Championships in Beijing. Shortly afterwards, she won gold in 42.92 seconds at the African Championships in Accra, alongside Obi Jennifer, Rosemary Chukwuma , and Miracle Ezechukwu.

In November 2026, Nwankwo competed at the Youth Olympics Games, winning gold in the 100 meters with a wind assisted time of 11.16 seconds. She became the third Nigerian to win the event since Rosemary Chukwuma in 2018.
