= Saint Kitts and Nevis at the 2018 Summer Youth Olympics =

- IOC code: SKN
- NOC: St. Kitts and Nevis Olympic Committee

in Buenos Aires, Argentina 6 – 18 October 2018
- Competitors: 2 in 1 sport
- Medals: Gold 0 Silver 0 Bronze 0 Total 0

Summer Youth Olympics appearances
- 2010; 2014; 2018

St. Kitts and Nevis participated at the 2018 Summer Youth Olympics in Buenos Aires, Argentina from 6 October to 18 October 2018.
