= Swaziland at the 2014 Summer Youth Olympics =

Eswatini at the 2014 Summer Youth Olympics
- IOC code: SWZ
- NOC: Swaziland Olympic and Commonwealth Games Association

in Nanjing
- Competitors: 4 in 3 sports
- Medals: Gold 0 Silver 0 Bronze 0 Total 0

Summer Youth Olympics appearances
- 2010; 2014; 2018

Swaziland competed at the 2014 Summer Youth Olympics, in Nanjing, China from 16 August to 28 August 2014.

== Golf ==
Swaziland was given a team of 2 athletes to compete from the Tripartite Commission.

Individual

| Athlete | Event | Round 1 | | Round 2 | | | Round 3 | | | Total | |
| Athlete | Event | Score | Rank | Score | Total | Rank | Score | Total | Rank | Score | Rank |
|---|---|---|---|---|---|---|---|---|---|---|---|
| James Pennington | Boys | +5 | 25 | +23 | +28 | 30 | +13 | +41 | 30 | +41 | 30 |
| Nosimilo Kgomo | Girls | Withdrew | | did not advance | | | | | | | |

== Swimming ==
Swaziland qualified one swimmer.

Boys

| Athlete | Event | Heat | | Semifinal | | Final | |
| Athlete | Event | Time | Rank | Time | Rank | Time | Rank |
|---|---|---|---|---|---|---|---|
| Gabriel Richter | 50 m freestyle | 26.15 | 39 | did not advance | | | |

== Taekwondo ==
Swaziland was given a wild card to compete.

Girls

| Athlete | Event | Round of 16 | Quarterfinals | Semifinals | Final | Rank |
| Athlete | Event | Opposition Result | Opposition Result | Opposition Result | Opposition Result | Rank |
|---|---|---|---|---|---|---|
| Carlota Munave | +63 kg | M Dieng (SEN); W 6 – 5 | U Abdullaeva (UZB); L 3 – 17 | did not advance | | 5 |
