= Palau at the 2014 Summer Youth Olympics =

- IOC code: PLW
- NOC: Palau National Olympic Committee

in Nanjing
- Competitors: 3 in 3 sports
- Medals: Gold 0 Silver 0 Bronze 0 Total 0

Summer Youth Olympics appearances
- 2010; 2014; 2018

Palau competed at the 2014 Summer Youth Olympics, in Nanjing, China from 16 August to 28 August 2014.

== Athletics ==
Palau qualified one athlete.

Qualification Legend: Q=Final A (medal); qB=Final B (non-medal); qC=Final C (non-medal); qD=Final D (non-medal); qE=Final E (non-medal)

Boys
Track & road events

Athlete	Event	Heats		Final	
Athlete	Event	Result	Rank	Result	Rank
Gwynn Uehara	100 m	11.51	21 qC	DNS	

== Swimming ==
Palau qualified one swimmer.

Girls

Athlete	Event	Heat		Semifinal		Final	
Athlete	Event	Time	Rank	Time	Rank	Time	Rank
Dirngulbai Misech	200 m freestyle	2:33.57	36	—		did not advance	
Dirngulbai Misech	100 m butterfly	1:18.33	30	did not advance			

== Wrestling ==
Palau was given a spot to compete from the Tripartite Commission.

Key:

- VT - Victory by Fall.
- PP - Decision by Points - the loser with technical points.
- PO - Decision by Points - the loser without technical points.

Boys

Athlete	Event	Group stage				Final / RM	Rank
Athlete	Event	Opposition Score	Opposition Score	Opposition Score	Rank	Opposition Score	Rank
James Dydasco	Freestyle -63kg	E Steyn (RSA); L 0 – 4 ^{VT}	I Julakidze (GEO); L 1 – 4 ^{ST}	T Mammadov (AZE); L 0 – 4 ^{ST}	4 Q	D Lloyd (NZL); L 0 – 4	8
