= Saint Kitts and Nevis at the 2010 Summer Youth Olympics =

- IOC code: SKN
- NOC: Saint Kitts and Nevis Olympic Committee

in Singapore
- Competitors: 2 in 1 sport
- Flag bearer: Lonzo Wilkinson

Summer Youth Olympics appearances
- 2010; 2014; 2018

Saint Kitts and Nevis competed in the 2010 Summer Youth Olympics which were held in Singapore from August 14 to August 26, 2010.

== Athletics ==
Note: The athletes who do not have a "Q" next to their Qualification Rank advance to a non-medal ranking final.

=== Boys ===
Track and Road Events

Athletes	Event	Qualification		Final	
Athletes	Event	Result	Rank	Result	Rank
Lonzo Wilkinson	Boys’ 200m	23.76	23 qD	23.23	21

=== Girls ===
Track and Road Events

Athletes	Event	Qualification		Final	
Athletes	Event	Result	Rank	Result	Rank
Odinakachukwa Miller	Girls’ 100m	12.59	15 qB	12.64	14
