= Hong Kong at the 2026 Summer Youth Olympics =

- Flag of Hong Kong
- IOC code: HKG
- NOC: Sports Federation and Olympic Committee of Hong Kong, China
- Website: www.hkolympic.org

in Dakar, Senegal October 31, 2026 – November 13, 2026
- Competitors: 15 in 12 sports
- Flag bearers: Man Wui Kiu & Poon Hao Ran
- Medals: Gold 1 Silver 1 Bronze 1 Total 3

Summer Youth Olympics appearances (overview)
- 2010; 2014; 2018; 2026

Hong Kong is scheduled to compete at the 2026 Summer Youth Olympics in Dakar, Senegal from October 31 to November 13, 2026. This will mark Hong Kong's fourth appearance at the Youth Olympics, after making its debut in 2010.

Swimmer Man Wui Kiu and wushu taolu athlete Poon Hao Ran served as the flag bearers for the opening ceremony.

== Competitors ==
The following is the list of number of competitors participating at the Games per sport/discipline.

Sport	Men	Women	Total
Athletics	1	0	1
Badminton	0	1	1
Boxing	1	0	1
Breaking	1	0	1
Coastal rowing	1	1	2
Fencing	1	0	1
Road cycling	1	0	1
Sailing	1	0	1
Swimming	1	1	2
Table tennis	1	1	2
Triathlon	0	1	1
Wushu	1	0	1
Total	10	5	15

== Athletics ==
Hong Kong entered one male athlete.

=== Track & road events ===
Men

Athlete	Event	Heat		Semifinal		Final	
Athlete	Event	Result	Rank	Result	Rank	Result	Rank
Au Ho Chun	1500 m						

== Badminton ==
Hong Kong entered one female athlete.

Athlete	Event	Round of 16	Quarterfinals	Semifinals	Final / BM	
Athlete	Event	Opposition Result	Opposition Result	Opposition Result	Opposition Result	Rank
Ip Sum Yau	Women's singles					

== Boxing ==
Hong Kong entered one male athlete in the −50 kg category.

Men

Athlete	Weight	Round of 16	Quarterfinals	Semifinals	Final / BM	
Athlete	Weight	Opposition Result	Opposition Result	Opposition Result	Opposition Result	Rank
Chan Yik Kan	–50 kg					

== Breaking ==
Hong Kong entered one male athlete.

Breaker	Nickname	Event	Pre-select		Group Stage						Quarter-finals	Semi-finals	Final / BM	
Breaker	Nickname	Event	Score	Rank	Opposition Result	Opposition Result	Opposition Result	Round	Votes	Rank	Opposition Result	Opposition Result	Opposition Result	Rank
Sunny Lin	Sunny	B-Boys	69.6	9	Leo (ITA); D 1–1	Saturn (TPE); L 0–2	Edgar (LAT); D 1–1	2	18	3	Did not advance			

== Coastal rowing ==
Hong Kong entered two rowers, one of each gender.

Athlete	Event	Round of 16	Quarterfinals	Semifinals	Final / BM	
Athlete	Event	Opposition Result	Opposition Result	Opposition Result	Opposition Result	Rank
Cai Chun	Men's solo					
Chen Wai Hei	Women's solo					
Cai Chun; Chen Wai Hei	Mixed double sculls					

== Fencing ==
Hong Kong entered one male athlete.

Athlete	Event	Round of 64	Round of 32	Round of 16	Quarterfinal	Semifinal	Final / BM	
Athlete	Event	Opposition Score	Opposition Score	Opposition Score	Opposition Score	Opposition Score	Opposition Score	Rank
Ho Shing Him Harris	Men's foil							

== Road cycling ==
Hong Kong entered one male athlete.

Men

Athlete	Event	Time	Rank
Lee Wan Chun	Road race		
Lee Wan Chun	Time trial		

== Sailing ==
Hong Kong entered one male athlete.

Athlete	Event	Opening Series – Points per Race											Total points	Net points	Final rank
Athlete	Event	1	2	3	4	5	6	7	8	9	10	M	Total points	Net points	Final rank
Ng Hoi Tik	Men's windsurfing														

== Swimming ==
Hong Kong entered two swimmers, one male and one female.

Athlete	Event	Heat		Semifinal		Final	
Athlete	Event	Time	Rank	Time	Rank	Time	Rank
Lau Chor Tik	200 m freestyle						
Lau Chor Tik	400 m freestyle						
Lau Chor Tik	800 m freestyle						
Man Wui Kiu	200 m freestyle						
Man Wui Kiu	400 m freestyle						
Man Wui Kiu	50 m breaststroke						
Man Wui Kiu	100 m breaststroke						

== Table tennis ==
Hong Kong entered two athletes (one male and one female).

Athlete	Event	Preliminary	Round 1	Round 2	Round 3	Round of 16	Quarterfinals	Semifinals	Final / BM	
Athlete	Event	Opposition Result	Opposition Result	Opposition Result	Opposition Result	Opposition Result	Opposition Result	Opposition Result	Opposition Result	Rank
Li Ki Ho	Men's singles									
Su Tsz Tung	Women's singles									
Li Ki Ho; Su Tsz Tung	Mixed doubles									

== Triathlon ==
Hong Kong entered one female athlete.

Athlete	Event	Time						Rank
Athlete	Event	Swim (750m)	Trans 1	Bike (20km)	Trans 2	Run (5km)	Total	Rank
Ng Yuet Hei	Women's individual							

== Wushu ==
Hong Kong entered one male athlete after quotas were assigned by the International Wushu Federation.

Athlete	Event	Taijishan routine		Taijiquan routine		Total Points	Final Rank
Athlete	Event	Points	Rank	Points	Rank	Total Points	Final Rank
Poon Hao Ran	Men's taijiquan combined						
