= 2018 Diamond League =

- Edition: 9th
- Dates: 4 May – 31 August
- Events: 32
- Meetings: 14
- Individual Prize Money (US$): US$ 9 million

The 2018 Diamond League was the ninth season of the annual series of outdoor track and field meetings, organised by the International Association of Athletics Federations (IAAF). It is the second edition to feature the new championship-style system.

== Schedule ==
The following fourteen meetings are scheduled to be included in the 2018 season:

| Leg | Date | Meet | Stadium | City | Country | Events (M+W) |
|---|---|---|---|---|---|---|
| 1 | 4 May | Doha Diamond League | Qatar SC Stadium | Doha | Qatar | 7 + 6 = 13 |
| 2 | 12 May | IAAF Diamond League Shanghai | Shanghai Stadium | Shanghai | China | 7 + 7 = 14 |
| 3 | 26 May | Prefontaine Classic | Hayward Field | Eugene | United States | 7 + 7 = 14 |
| 4 | 31 May | Golden Gala – Pietro Mennea | Stadio Olimpico | Rome | Italy | 8 + 5 = 13 |
| 5 | 7 June | Bislett Games | Bislett Stadium | Oslo | Norway | 6 + 8 = 14 |
| 6 | 10 June | Bauhausgalan | Stockholm Olympic Stadium | Stockholm | Sweden | 7 + 6 = 13 |
| 7 | 30 June | Meeting de Paris | Stade Sébastien Charléty | Paris | France | 6 + 7 = 13 |
| 8 | 5 July | Athletissima | Stade Olympique de la Pontaise | Lausanne | Switzerland | 7 + 8 = 15 |
| 9 | 13 July | Meeting International Mohammed VI d'Athlétisme de Rabat | Prince Moulay Abdellah Stadium | Rabat | Morocco | 7 + 7 = 14 |
| 10 | 20 July | Herculis | Stade Louis II | Monaco | Monaco | 7 + 6 = 13 |
| 11 | 21–22 July | Müller Anniversary Games | London Stadium | London | United Kingdom | 6 + 8 = 14 |
| 12 | 18 August | Müller Grand Prix Birmingham | Alexander Stadium | Birmingham | United Kingdom | 7 + 7 = 14 |
| 13 | 30 August | Weltklasse Zürich | Letzigrund | Zürich | Switzerland | 8 + 8 = 16 |
| 14 | 31 August | AG Memorial Van Damme | King Baudouin Stadium | Brussels | Belgium | 8 + 8 = 16 |

== Season overview ==
- Events held at Diamond League meets, but not included in the Diamond League points race, are marked in grey background.
- Diamond league final winners are marked with light blue background.

=== Men ===
==== Track ====
| # | Meeting | 100 m | 200 m | 400 m | 800 m | 1500 m | 5000 m | 110 m h | 400 m h | 3000 m st |
| 1 | Doha | - | Noah Lyles (USA); 19.83 MR PB | Steven Gardiner (BAH); 43.87 WL MR NR | Emmanuel Korir (KEN); 1:45.21 | Taresa Tolosa (ETH); 3:35.07 | - | - | Abderrahman Samba (QAT); 47.57 WL DLR MR NR | Chala Beyo (ETH); 8:13.71 |
| 2 | Shanghai | Reece Prescod (GBR); 10.04 SB | - | Steven Gardiner (BAH); 43.99 MR | Wycliffe Kinyamal (KEN); 1:43.91 MR PB | Timothy Cheruiyot (KEN); 3:31.48 | Birhanu Balew (BHR); 13:09.64 | Omar McLeod (JAM); 13.16 WL | - | - |
| 3 | Eugene | Ronnie Baker (USA); 9.78w | Noah Lyles (USA); 19.69 PB | - | Emmanuel Korir (KEN); 1:45.16 SB | Timothy Cheruiyot (KEN); 3:49.87 (mile) | Selemon Barega (ETH); 8:20.01 (2-mile) | Omar McLeod (JAM); 13.01w | - | Benjamin Kigen (KEN); 8:09.07 PB |
| 4 | Rome | Ronnie Baker (USA); 9.93 WL PB | - | Fred Kerley (USA); 44.33 SB | Wycliffe Kinyamal (KEN); 1:44.65 | Timothy Cheruiyot (KEN); 3:31.22 WL | - | - | Abderrahman Samba (QAT); 47.48 AR WL DLR MR | Conseslus Kipruto (KEN); 8:08.40 WL |
| 5 | Oslo | - | Ramil Guliyev (TUR); 19.90 SB | - | - | Elijah Manangoi (KEN); 3:56.95 (mile) | - | - | Abderrahman Samba (QAT); 47.60 MR | - |
| 6 | Stockholm | Hassan Taftian (IRN); 10.07 SB | Ramil Guliyev (TUR); 19.92 | - | Ferguson Cheruiyot Rotich (KEN); 2:14.88 (1000m) WL PB | Jakob Ingebrigtsen (NOR); 3:37.42 | Selemon Barega (ETH); 13:04.05 WL | - | Abderrahman Samba (QAT); 47.41 AR, DLR, MR, PB | - |
| 7 | Paris | Ronnie Baker (USA); 9.88 WL PB | Michael Norman (USA); 19.84 PB | - | Ferguson Cheruiyot Rotich (KEN); 1:43.73 SB | Timothy Cheruiyot (KEN); 3:29.71 WL | - | Ronald Levy (JAM); 13.18 | Abderrahman Samba (QAT); 46.98 AR WL DLR MR PB | - |
| 8 | Lausanne | - | Noah Lyles (USA); 19.69 WL PB | - | - | - | Birhanu Balew (BHR); 13:01.09 WL PB | Sergey Shubenkov (ANA); 12.95 | Abderrahman Samba (QAT); 47.42 | - |
| 9 | Rabat | Christian Coleman (USA); 9.98 MR SB | - | Akeem Bloomfield (JAM); 44.33 MR | - | Brahim Kaazouzi (MAR); 3:33.22 PB | Yomif Kejelcha (ETH); 7:32.93 (3000m) WL MR | - | - | Benjamin Kigen (KEN); 8:06.19 WL PB |
| 10 | Monaco | - | Noah Lyles (USA); 19.65 WL MR PB | - | Nijel Amos (BOT); 1:42.14 WL MR | Timothy Cheruiyot (KEN); 3:28.41 WL PB | - | Sergey Shubenkov (ANA); 13.07 | - | Soufiane El Bakkali (MAR); 7:58.15 WL PB |
| 11 | London | Ronnie Baker (USA); 9.90 | Akeem Bloomfield (JAM); 19.81 PB | Abdalleleh Haroun (QAT); 44.07 NR PB | Emmanuel Korir (KEN); 1:42.05 WL MR PB | Matthew Centrowitz (USA); 3:35.22 | Paul Chelimo (USA); 13:14.01 | Ronald Levy (JAM); 13.13 SB | Karsten Warholm (NOR); 47.65 MR NR PB | - |
| 12 | Birmingham | Christian Coleman (USA); 9.94 SB | - | Fred Kerley (USA); 45.54 | Emmanuel Korir (KEN); 1:42.79 MR | Stewart McSweyn (AUS); 3:54.60 PB (mile) | - | Orlando Ortega (ESP); 13.08 SB | - | Conseslus Kipruto (KEN); 8:14.33 |
| 13 | Zürich | - | Noah Lyles (USA); 19.67 | Fred Kerley (USA); 44.80 | - | Timothy Cheruiyot (KEN); 3:30.27 | - | - | Kyron McMaster (IVB); 48.08 | Conseslus Kipruto (KEN); 8:10.15 |
| 14 | Brussels | Christian Coleman (USA); 9.79 | - | - | Emmanuel Korir (KEN); 1:44.72 | - | Selemon Barega (ETH); 12:43.02 | Sergey Shubenkov (ANA); 12.97 | - | - |

==== Field ====
| # | Meeting | Long jump | Triple jump | High jump | Pole vault | Shot put | Discus | Javelin |
| 1 | Doha | - | Pedro Pablo Pichardo (POR); 17.95 WL | Mutaz Essa Barshim (QAT); 2.40 WL | - | - | - | Thomas Röhler (GER); 91.78 |
| 2 | Shanghai | Luvo Manyonga (RSA); 8.56 | - | - | Renaud Lavillenie (FRA); 5.81 | - | - | - |
| 3 | Eugene | - | Christian Taylor (USA); 17.73 | Mutaz Essa Barshim (QAT); 2.36 | Sam Kendricks (USA); 5.81 | Ryan Crouser (USA); 22.53 MR SB | - | Thomas Röhler (GER); 89.88 MR |
| 4 | Rome | Luvo Manyonga (RSA); 8.58 WL | - | - | Sam Kendricks (USA); 5.84 SB | - | Fedrick Dacres (JAM); 68.51 | - |
| 5 | Oslo | - | - | Mutaz Essa Barshim (QAT); 2.36 | - | Tomas Walsh (NZL); 22.29 MR | Andrius Gudžius (LTU); 69.04 | - |
| 6 | Stockholm | Juan Miguel Echevarria (CUB); 8.83w | - | - | Armand Duplantis (SWE); 5.86 | - | -Fedrick Dacres (JAM); 69.67 MR, WL, NR, PB | - |
| 7 | Paris | - | - | - | Sam Kendricks (USA); 5.96 WL | - | Fedrick Dacres (JAM); 67.01 | - |
| 8 | Lausanne | - | Christian Taylor (USA); 17.62 | Danil Lysenko (ANA); 2.37 SB | Renaud Lavillenie (FRA); 5.91 | Tomas Walsh (NZL); 21.92 | - | - |
| 9 | Rabat | Tajay Gayle (JAM); 8.09 | - | - | Sam Kendricks (USA); 5.86 MR | - | - | Magnus Kirt (EST); 89.75 MR NR PB |
| 10 | Monaco | - | Christian Taylor (USA); 17.86 | Danil Lysenko (ANA); 2.40 =WL =MR PB | - | Ryan Crouser (USA); 22.05 | - | - |
| 11 | London | Luvo Manyonga (RSA); 8.58 MR =SB | - | - | Sam Kendricks (USA); 5.92 | - | - | Andreas Hofmann (GER); 89.82 |
| 12 | Birmingham | Luvo Manyonga (RSA); 8.53 MR | - | Brandon Starc (AUS); 2.33 PB | - | - | - | - |
| 13 | Zürich | Luvo Manyonga (RSA); 8.36 | - | - | Timur Morgunov (ANA); 5.91 | Tomas Walsh (NZL); 22.60 | - | Andreas Hofmann (GER); 91.44 |
| 14 | Brussels | - | Pedro Pablo Pichardo (POR); 17.49 | Brandon Starc (AUS); 2.33 | Timur Morgunov (ANA); 5.93 | - | Fedrick Dacres (JAM); 68.67 | - |

=== Women ===
==== Track ====
| # | Meeting | 100 m | 200 m | 400 m | 800 m | 1500 m | 5000 m | 100 m h | 400 m h | 3000 m st |
| 1 | Doha | Marie-Josée Ta Lou (CIV); 10.85 WL PB | - | - | - | Caster Semenya (RSA); 3:59.92 WL NR | Caroline Chepkoech Kipkirui (KEN); 8:29.05 WL PB (3000 m) | Kendra Harrison (USA); 12.53 SB | - | - |
| 2 | Shanghai | - | Shaunae Miller-Uibo (BAH); 22.06 MR SB | - | - | - | - | Brianna Rollins-McNeal (USA); 12.50 MR | Dalilah Muhammad (USA); 53.77 SB | Beatrice Chepkoech (KEN); 9:07.27 |
| 3 | Eugene | Marie-Josée Ta Lou (CIV); 10.88 | - | Shaunae Miller-Uibo (BAH); 49.52 | Caster Semenya (RSA); 1:55.92 MR SB | Shelby Houlihan (USA); 3:59.06 PB | Genzebe Dibaba (ETH); 14:26.89 | - | Janieve Russell (JAM); 54.06 | - |
| 4 | Rome | - | Marie-Josée Ta Lou (CIV); 22.49 SB | Salwa Eid Naser (BHR); 50.51 SB | - | - | - | Sharika Nelvis (USA); 12.76 | Georganne Moline (USA); 53.97 SB | Hyvin Jepkemoi (KEN); 9:04.96 WL MR |
| 5 | Oslo | Murielle Ahouré (CIV); 10.91 | - | Salwa Eid Naser (BHR); 49.98 SB | Caster Semenya (RSA); 1:57.25 | - | - | Danielle Williams (JAM); 12.60 SB | Dalilah Muhammad (USA); 53.65 SB | Hyvin Jepkemoi (KEN); 9:09.63 |
| 6 | Stockholm | Dina Asher-Smith (GBR); 10.93 | - | -Salwa Eid Naser (BHR); 49.84 NR PB | Shume Chaltu Regasa (ETH); 2:01.16 | Gudaf Tsegay (ETH); 3:57.64 MR, PB | - | Brianna Rollins-McNeal (USA); 12.38 WL, MR | - | - |
| 7 | Paris | - | Shericka Jackson (JAM); 22.05 PB | Salwa Eid Naser (BHR); 49.55 AR PB | Caster Semenya (RSA); 1:54.25 WL DLR MR NR PB | - | - | - | - | Beatrice Chepkoech (KEN); 8:59.36 WL PB |
| 8 | Lausanne | Marie-Josée Ta Lou (CIV); 10.90 | Gabrielle Thomas (USA); 22.47 | Salwa Eid Naser (BHR); 49.78 | Francine Niyonsaba (BDI); 1:57.80 | Shelby Houlihan (USA); 3:57.34 MR PB | - | - | Shamier Little (USA); 53.41 SB | - |
| 9 | Rabat | - | Shaunae Miller-Uibo (BAH); 22.29 MR | - | Francine Niyonsaba (BDI); 1:57.90 | - | Hellen Obiri (KEN); 14:21.75 WL | Brianna Rollins-McNeal (USA); 12.51 MR | - | - |
| 10 | Monaco | Marie-Josée Ta Lou (CIV); 10.89 | - | Shaunae Miller-Uibo (BAH); 48.97 WL DLR MR NR PB | Caster Semenya (RSA); 1:54.60 MR | - | - | Queen Harrison (USA); 12.64 SB | - | Beatrice Chepkoech (KEN); 8:44.32 WR |
| 11 | London | Shelly-Ann Fraser-Pryce (JAM); 10.98 SB | Jenna Prandini (USA); 22.16 PB | Stephenie Ann McPherson (JAM); 50.31 SB | Ce'Aira Brown (USA); 1:58.57 PR | Sifan Hassan (NED); 4:14.71 WL DLR MR NR PB (mile) | Lilian Kasait Rengeruk (KEN); 8:41.51 (3000m) | Kendra Harrison (USA); 12.36 WL | Shamier Little (USA); 53.95 | - |
| 12 | Birmingham | - | Shaunae Miller-Uibo (BAH); 22.15 MR | - | Laura Muir (GBR); 2:33.92 (1000m) | Sifan Hassan (NED); 4:00.60 | Agnes Tirop (KEN); 8:32.21 (3000 m) | Pamela Dutkiewicz (GER); 12.84 | Léa Sprunger (SUI); 54.86 | - |
| 13 | Zürich | Murielle Ahouré (CIV); 11.01 | - | - | Caster Semenya (RSA); 1:55.27 | - | Hellen Obiri (KEN); 14:38.39 | - | Dalilah Muhammad (USA); 53.88 | - |
| 14 | Brussels | - | Shaunae Miller-Uibo (BAH); 22.12 | Salwa Eid Naser (BHR); 49.33 | - | Laura Muir (GBR); 3:58.49 | - | Brianna Rollins-McNeal (USA); 12.61 | - | Beatrice Chepkoech (KEN); 8:55.10 |

==== Field ====
| # | Meeting | Long jump | Triple jump | High jump | Pole vault | Shot put | Discus | Javelin |
| 1 | Doha | - | - | - | Sandi Morris (USA); 4.84 MR | - | Sandra Perković (CRO); 71.38 m WL DLR MR | - |
| 2 | Shanghai | - | Caterine Ibargüen (COL); 14.80 WL | Mariya Lasitskene (ANA); 1.97 WL | - | Gong Lijiao (CHN); 19.99 WL | - | Lü Huihui (CHN); 66.85 MR SB |
| 3 | Eugene | - | - | - | Jenn Suhr (USA); 4.85 MR | - | - | - |
| 4 | Rome | - | - | Mariya Lasitskene (ANA); 2.02 WL | - | - | Sandra Perković (CRO); 68.93 m MR | - |
| 5 | Oslo | - | Caterine Ibargüen (COL); 14.89 SB | - | Sandi Morris (USA); 4.81 | - | - | Tatsiana Khaladovich (BLR); 67.47 NR PB |
| 6 | Stockholm | Lorraine Ugen (GBR); 6.85 SB | - | Mariya Lasitskene (ANA); 2.00 | - | - | - | - |
| 7 | Paris | - | Caterine Ibargüen (COL); 14.83 SB | Mariya Lasitskene (ANA); 2.04 WL MR | - | - | Sandra Perković (CRO); 68.60 MR | - |
| 8 | Lausanne | Malaika Mihambo (GER); 6.90 | - | - | Katerina Stefanidi (GRE); 4.82 SB | - | - | Nikola Ogrodníková (CZE); 65.02 |
| 9 | Rabat | - | Caterine Ibargüen (COL); 14.96 WL MR | Mirela Demireva (BUL); 1.94 | - | Christina Schwanitz (GER); 19.40 | - | - |
| 10 | Monaco | - | - | - | Anzhelika Sidorova (ANA); 4.85 =PB | Gong Lijiao (CHN); 20.31 | - | - |
| 11 | London | Shara Proctor (GBR); 6.91 SB | - | Mariya Lasitskene (ANA); 2.04 =WL | - | - | Sandra Perković (CRO); 67.24 | Lü Huihui (CHN); 65.54 |
| 12 | Birmingham | Malaika Mihambo (GER); 6.96 MR | - | - | Sandi Morris (USA); 4.62 | Christina Schwanitz (GER); 18.20 | - | - |
| 13 | Zürich | - | Caterine Ibargüen (COL); 14.56 | Mariya Lasitskene (ANA); 1.97 | Katerina Stefanidi (GRE); 4.87 | - | - | Tatsiana Khaladovich (BLR); 66.99 |
| 14 | Brussels | Caterine Ibargüen (COL); 6.80 | - | - | - | Gong Lijiao (CHN); 19.83 | Yaime Pérez (CUB); 65.00 | - |

== Results ==
Doha
| Event | 1st +8 pts | 2nd +7 pts | 3rd +6 pts | 4th +5 pts | 5th +4 pts | 6th +3 pts | 7th +2 pts | 8th +1 pts |
|---|---|---|---|---|---|---|---|---|
| Men's 200m (+1.3 m/s) | Noah Lyles; USA | 19.83 | Jereem Richards; TTO | 19.99 | Ramil Guliyev; TUR | 20.11 | Aaron Brown; CAN | 20.18 | Nethaneel Mitchell-Blake; GBR | 20.37 | Andre de Grasse; CAN | 20.46 | Brandon Carnes; USA | 20.56 | Rasheed Dwyer; JAM | 20.72 |
| Men's 400m | Steven Gardiner; BAH | 43.87 | Abdalelah Haroun; QAT | 44.50 | Isaac Makwala; BOT | 44.92 | Gil Roberts; USA | 45.22 | Baboloki Thebe; BOT | 45.58 | Mohamed Nasir Abbas; QAT | 45.76 | Vernon Norwood; USA | 45.82 | Pieter Conradie; RSA | 46.68 |
| Men's 800m | Emmanuel Kipkurui Korir; KEN | 1:45.21 | Elijah Motonei Manangoi; KEN | 1:45.60 | Nicholas Kiplangat Kipkoech; KEN | 1:46.51 | Adam Kszczot; POL | 1:46.70 | Ferguson Cheruiyot Rotich; KEN | 1:46.76 | Clayton Murphy; USA | 1:47.22 | Antoine Gakeme; BDI | 1:47.25 | Jamal Hairane; QAT | 1:47.62 |
| Men's 400mH | Abderrahman Samba; QAT | 47.57 | Bershawn Jackson; USA | 49.08 | Kyron McMaster; IVB | 49.46 | Yasmani Copello; TUR | 49.95 | Cornel Fredericks; RSA | 50.03 | Kerron Clement; USA | 50.19 | Jack Green; GBR | 50.22 | Kariem Hussein; SUI | 51.40 |
| Men's High Jump | Mutaz Essa Barshim; QAT | 2.40 m | Majd Eddin Ghazal; SYR | 2.33 m | Donald Thomas; BAH | 2.30 m | Mateusz Przybylko; GER | 2.24 m | Andrii Protsenko; UKR | 2.24 m | Wang Yu; CHN | 2.20 m | Edgar Rivera; MEX | 2.20 m | Hamdi Alamin; QAT | 2.20 m |
| Men's Triple Jump | Pedro Pichardo; POR | 17.95 m | Christian Taylor; USA | 17.81 m | Alexis Copello; AZE | 17.21 m | Nelson Évora; POR | 17.04 m | Chris Benard; USA | 16.96 m | Godfrey Khotso Mokoena; RSA | 16.92 m | Bin Dong; CHN | 16.65 m | Max Heß; GER | 16.52 m |
| Men's Javelin Throw | Thomas Röhler; GER | 91.78 m | Johannes Vetter; GER | 91.56 m | Andreas Hofmann; GER | 90.08 m | Neeraj Chopra; IND | 87.43 m | Jakub Vadlejch; CZE | 86.67 m | Magnus Kirt; EST | 83.97 m | Ahmed Bader Magour; QAT | 83.71 m | Julius Yego; KEN | 80.75 m |
| Women's 100m (+1.5 m/s) | Marie-Josée Ta Lou; CIV | 10.85 | Blessing Okagbare; NGR | 10.90 | Elaine Thompson-Herah; JAM | 10.93 | Murielle Ahouré-Demps; CIV | 10.96 | Carina Horn; RSA | 10.98 | Dafne Schippers; NED | 11.03 | Mujinga Kambundji; SUI | 11.17 | Jura Levy; JAM | 11.29 |
| Women's 1500m | Caster Semenya; RSA | 3:59.92 | Nelly Jepkosgei; BRN | 4:00.99 | Habitam Alemu; ETH | 4:01.41 | Besu Sado; ETH | 4:01.75 | Alemaz Samuel; ETH | 4:01.78 | Gudaf Tsegay; ETH | 4:01.81 | Rababe Arafi; MAR | 4:03.69 | Judith Kiyeng; KEN | 4:03.87 |
| Women's 3000m | Caroline Chepkoech Kipkirui; KEN | 8:29.05 | Agnes Jebet Tirop; KEN | 8:29.09 | Hyvin Kiyeng; KEN | 8:30.51 | Jenny Simpson; USA | 8:30.83 | Letesenbet Gidey; ETH | 8:30.96 | Lilian Kasait Rengeruk; KEN | 8:33.13 | Meskerem Mamo; ETH | 8:33.63 | Beyenu Degefa; ETH | 8:35.76 |
| Women's 100mH (+0.5 m/s) | Kendra Harrison; USA | 12.53 | Brianna McNeal; USA | 12.58 | Sharika Nelvis; USA | 12.75 | Jasmin Stowers; USA | 12.77 | Danielle Williams; JAM | 12.82 | Isabelle Pedersen; NOR | 12.82 | Nadine Visser; NED | 12.94 | Dawn Harper-Nelson; USA | 13.21 |
| Women's Pole Vault | Sandi Morris; USA | 4.84 m | Holly Bradshaw; GBR | 4.64 m | Katie Moon; USA | 4.64 m | Nikoleta Kyriakopoulou; GRE | 4.64 m | Aikaterini Stefanidi; GRE | 4.64 m | Robeilys Peinado; VEN | 4.64 m | Alysha Newman; CAN | 4.54 m | Olga Mullina; ANA | 4.44 m |
| Women's Discus Throw | Sandra Perković; CRO | 71.38 m | Yaimé Pérez; CUB | 66.82 m | Denia Caballero; CUB | 63.80 m | Andressa de Morais; BRA | 63.77 m | Dani Stevens; AUS | 63.59 m | Gia Lewis-Smallwood; USA | 58.73 m | Whitney Ashley; USA | 58.42 m | |

Shanghai
| Event | 1st +8 pts | 2nd +7 pts | 3rd +6 pts | 4th +5 pts | 5th +4 pts | 6th +3 pts | 7th +2 pts | 8th +1 pts |
|---|---|---|---|---|---|---|---|---|
| Men's 100m (−0.5 m/s) | Reece Prescod; GBR | 10.04 | Bingtian Su; CHN | 10.05 | Zhenye Xie; CHN | 10.17 | Chijindu Ujah; GBR | 10.18 | Isiah Young; USA | 10.18 | Ramil Guliyev; TUR | 10.20 | Justin Gatlin; USA | 10.20 | Andre de Grasse; CAN | 10.25 |
| Men's 400m | Steven Gardiner; BAH | 43.99 | Isaac Makwala; BOT | 44.23 | Abdalelah Haroun; QAT | 44.51 | Fred Kerley; USA | 44.71 | Christian Taylor; USA | 45.24 | Michael Cherry; USA | 45.60 | Vernon Norwood; USA | 45.82 | Zhongze Guo; CHN | 47.04 |
| Men's 800m | Wyclife Kinyamal; KEN | 1:43.91 | Jonathan Kitilit; KEN | 1:43.95 | Marcin Lewandowski; POL | 1:45.41 | Antoine Gakeme; BDI | 1:45.73 | Brandon McBride; CAN | 1:45.78 | Clayton Murphy; USA | 1:45.97 | Andrew Osagie; GBR | 1:46.36 | Rynhardt van Rensburg; RSA | 1:46.57 |
| Men's 1500m | Timothy Cheruiyot; KEN | 3:31.48 | Samuel Tefera; ETH | 3:31.63 | Abdelaati Iguider; MAR | 3:32.72 | Charles Cheboi Simotwo; KEN | 3:33.54 | Justus Soget; KEN | 3:34.33 | Aman Wote; ETH | 3:34.43 | Thiago André; BRA | 3:35.40 | Bethwell Birgen; KEN | 3:35.95 |
| Men's 110mH (+0.2 m/s) | Omar McLeod; JAM | 13.16 | Orlando Ortega; ESP | 13.17 | Sergey Shubenkov; RUS | 13.27 | Ronald Levy; JAM | 13.33 | Hansle Parchment; JAM | 13.48 | Aries Merritt; USA | 13.65 | Garfield Darien; FRA | 13.74 | Jianhang Zeng; CHN | 13.76 |
| Men's Pole Vault | Renaud Lavillenie; FRA | 5.81 m | Piotr Lisek; POL | 5.81 m | Changrui Xue; CHN | 5.71 m | Kurtis Marschall; AUS | 5.71 m | Yao Jie; CHN | 5.61 m | Shawnacy Barber; CAN | 5.61 m | Raphael Holzdeppe; GER | 5.61 m | Bokai Huang; CHN | 5.61 m |
| Men's Long Jump | Luvo Manyonga; RSA | 8.56 m | Yuhao Shi; CHN | 8.43 m | Henry Frayne; AUS | 8.15 m | Jeff Henderson; USA | 8.11 m | Changzhou Huang; CHN | 8.03 m | Xinglong Gao; CHN | 8.00 m | Damar Forbes; JAM | 7.99 m | Michael Hartfield; USA | 7.88 m |
| Women's 200m (−0.4 m/s) | Shaunae Miller-Uibo; BAH | 22.06 | Dafne Schippers; NED | 22.34 | Shericka Jackson; JAM | 22.36 | Marie-Josée Ta Lou; CIV | 22.58 | Mujinga Kambundji; SUI | 22.72 | Jenna Prandini; USA | 23.02 | Kyra Jefferson; USA | 23.05 | Deajah Stevens; USA | 23.05 |
| Women's 100mH (+0.9 m/s) | Brianna McNeal; USA | 12.50 | Sharika Nelvis; USA | 12.52 | Kendra Harrison; USA | 12.56 | Jasmin Stowers; USA | 12.71 | Isabelle Pedersen; NOR | 12.76 | Nadine Visser; NED | 12.81 | Cindy Roleder; GER | 12.81 | Dawn Harper-Nelson; USA | 12.94 |
| Women's 400mH | Dalilah Muhammad; USA | 53.77 | Janieve Russell; JAM | 53.78 | Sage Watson; CAN | 55.23 | Wenda Nel; RSA | 55.63 | Joanna Linkiewicz; POL | 55.84 | Leah Nugent; JAM | 56.54 | Xia Xiao; CHN | 58.48 | Georganne Moline; USA | 59.51 |
| Women's High Jump | Mariya Lasitskene; ANA | 1.97 m | Mirela Demireva; BUL | 1.94 m | Marie-Laurence Jungfleisch; GER | 1.88 m | Oksana Okuneva; UKR | 1.85 m | Levern Spencer; LCA | 1.85 m | Wang Yang; CHN | 1.85 m | Alyxandria Treasure; CAN | 1.85 m | Kateryna Tabashnyk; UKR | 1.85 m |
| Women's Triple Jump | Caterine Ibarguen; COL | 14.80 m | Shanieka Ricketts; JAM | 14.55 m | Kimberly Williams; JAM | 14.35 m | Rouguy Diallo; FRA | 14.21 m | Hanna Minenko; ISR | 14.19 m | Viktoriya Prokopenko; ANA | 13.93 m | Dovilė Kilty; LTU | 13.73 m | Anna Jagaciak; POL | 13.67 m |
| Women's Shot Put | Lijiao Gong; CHN | 19.99 m | Danniel Thomas-Dodd; JAM | 18.70 m | Raven Saunders; USA | 18.63 m | Yuliya Leantsiuk; BLR | 18.42 m | Paulina Guba; POL | 18.25 m | Anita Márton; HUN | 18.16 m | Gao Yang; CHN | 18.12 m | Valerie Adams; NZL | 18.01 m |
| Women's Javelin Throw | Huihui Lyu; CHN | 66.85 m | Marcelina Witek-Konofał; POL | 64.49 m | Eda Tuğsuz; TUR | 63.20 m | Tatsiana Khaladovich; BLR | 62.15 m | Elizabeth Gleadle; CAN | 61.53 m | Sunette Viljoen; RSA | 60.79 m | Katharina Molitor; GER | 59.38 m | Kelsey-Lee Barber; AUS | 57.47 m |

Eugene
| Event | 1st +8 pts | 2nd +7 pts | 3rd +6 pts | 4th +5 pts | 5th +4 pts | 6th +3 pts | 7th +2 pts | 8th +1 pts |
|---|---|---|---|---|---|---|---|---|
| Men's 200m (+2.0 m/s) | Noah Lyles; USA | 19.69 | Jereem Richards; TTO | 20.05 | Aaron Brown; CAN | 20.07 | Anaso Jobodwana; RSA | 20.42 | Nethaneel Mitchell-Blake; GBR | 20.51 | Ameer Webb; USA | 20.56 | Ramil Guliyev; TUR | 20.57 | Isaac Makwala; BOT | DNF |
| Men's 110mH (+3.0 m/s) | Omar McLeod; JAM | 13.01 | Sergey Shubenkov; RUS | 13.08 | Devon Allen; USA | 13.13 | Orlando Ortega; ESP | 13.17 | Ronald Levy; JAM | 13.26 | Aries Merritt; USA | 13.27 | Andrew Pozzi; GBR | 13.51 | Aleec Harris; USA | 13.52 |
| Men's 3000mSC | Benjamin Kigen; KEN | 8:09.07 | Conseslus Kipruto; KEN | 8:11.71 | Evan Jager; USA | 8:11.71 | Amos Kirui; KEN | 8:15.23 | Nicholas Kiptonui Bett; KEN | 8:15.52 | Jairus Kipchoge Birech; KEN | 8:18.76 | Hillary Bor; USA | 8:21.51 | Paul Kipsiele Koech; KEN | 8:23.22 |
| Men's High Jump | Mutaz Essa Barshim; QAT | 2.36 m | Danil Lysenko; ANA | 2.32 m | Wang Yu; CHN | 2.32 m | Erik Kynard; USA | 2.29 m | Jeron Robinson; USA | 2.26 m | Andrii Protsenko; UKR | 2.26 m | Mateusz Przybylko; GER | 2.26 m | Donald Thomas; BAH | 2.21 m |
| Men's Triple Jump | Christian Taylor; USA | 17.73 m | Will Claye; USA | 17.46 m | Almir dos Santos; BRA | 17.35 m | Alexis Copello; AZE | 17.24 m | Bin Dong; CHN | 17.22 m | Max Heß; GER | 16.95 m | Nelson Évora; POR | 16.93 m | Chris Benard; USA | 16.88 m |
| Men's Shot Put | Ryan Crouser; USA | 22.53 m | Michał Haratyk; POL | 21.97 m | Darlan Romani; BRA | 21.95 m | Tom Walsh; NZL | 21.84 m | Darrell Hill; USA | 21.19 m | Ryan Whiting; USA | 20.64 m | David Storl; GER | 20.49 m | Joe Kovacs; USA | 20.36 m |
| Men's Javelin Throw | Thomas Röhler; GER | 89.88 m | Johannes Vetter; GER | 89.34 m | Andreas Hofmann; GER | 86.45 m | Jakub Vadlejch; CZE | 85.40 m | Magnus Kirt; EST | 83.13 m | Neeraj Chopra; IND | 80.81 m | Ahmed Bader Magour; QAT | 78.16 m | Petr Frydrych; CZE | 69.67 m |
| Women's 100m (+1.9 m/s) | Marie-Josée Ta Lou; CIV | 10.88 | Murielle Ahouré-Demps; CIV | 10.90 | Elaine Thompson-Herah; JAM | 10.98 | Dafne Schippers; NED | 11.01 | Tori Bowie; USA | 11.03 | Dina Asher-Smith; GBR | 11.06 | Blessing Okagbare; NGR | 11.07 | Javianne Oliver; USA | 11.10 |
| Women's 400m | Shaunae Miller-Uibo; BAH | 49.52 | Phyllis Francis; USA | 50.81 | Shakima Wimbley; USA | 50.84 | Jessica Beard; USA | 50.89 | Stephenie Ann McPherson; JAM | 51.01 | Jaide Stepter Baynes; USA | 51.17 | Courtney Okolo; USA | 51.54 | |
| Women's 800m | Caster Semenya; RSA | 1:55.92 | Ajee Wilson; USA | 1:56.86 | Francine Niyonsaba; BDI | 1:56.88 | Habitam Alemu; ETH | 1:57.78 | Charlene Lipsey; USA | 1:58.35 | Margaret Nyairera Wambui; KEN | 1:58.67 | Raevyn Rogers; USA | 1:59.36 | Eunice Jepkoech Sum; KEN | 2:00.41 |
| Women's 1500m | Shelby Houlihan; USA | 3:59.06 | Laura Muir; GBR | 3:59.30 | Jenny Simpson; USA | 3:59.37 | Rababe Arafi; MAR | 3:59.51 | Winny Chebet; KEN | 4:00.60 | Linden Hall; AUS | 4:00.86 | Brenda Martinez; USA | 4:02.65 | Dawit Seyaum; ETH | 4:02.81 |
| Women's 5000m | Genzebe Dibaba; ETH | 14:26.89 | Letesenbet Gidey; ETH | 14:30.29 | Hellen Obiri; KEN | 14:35.03 | Gudaf Tsegay; ETH | 14:51.30 | Lilian Kasait Rengeruk; KEN | 15:01.15 | Margaret Chelimo Kipkemboi; KEN | 15:01.98 | Meraf Bahta; SWE | DQ (Note: Disqualified after competition due to antidoping rule violation) | Dominique Scott; RSA | 15:10.23 |
| Women's 400mH | Janieve Russell; JAM | 54.06 | Dalilah Muhammad; USA | 54.09 | Georganne Moline; USA | 54.33 | Sage Watson; CAN | 54.81 | Shamier Little; USA | 55.23 | Zuzana Hejnová; CZE | 55.36 | Ashley Spencer; USA | 55.58 | Cassandra Tate; USA | 55.97 |
| Women's Pole Vault | Jennifer Suhr; USA | 4.85 m | Eliza McCartney; NZL | 4.85 m | Sandi Morris; USA | 4.70 m | Katie Moon; USA | 4.70 m | Robeilys Peinado; VEN | 4.60 m | Anzhelika Sidorova; ANA | 4.60 m | Aikaterini Stefanidi; GRE | 4.60 m | Holly Bradshaw; GBR | 4.35 m |

Rome
| Event | 1st +8 pts | 2nd +7 pts | 3rd +6 pts | 4th +5 pts | 5th +4 pts | 6th +3 pts | 7th +2 pts | 8th +1 pts |
|---|---|---|---|---|---|---|---|---|
| Men's 100m (−0.4 m/s) | Ronnie Baker; USA | 9.93 | Jimmy Vicaut; FRA | 10.02 | Filippo Tortu; ITA | 10.04 | Christian Coleman; USA | 10.06 | Akani Simbine; RSA | 10.13 | Michael Rodgers; USA | 10.13 | Lamont Marcell Jacobs; ITA | 10.19 | Ramil Guliyev; TUR | 10.19 |
| Men's 400m | Fred Kerley; USA | 44.33 | Abdalelah Haroun; QAT | 44.37 | Paul Dedewo; USA | 44.58 | Michael Cherry; USA | 44.97 | Gil Roberts; USA | 45.22 | Davide Re; ITA | 45.49 | Matthew Hudson-Smith; GBR | 45.52 | Luguelín Santos; DOM | 45.81 |
| Men's 800m | Wyclife Kinyamal; KEN | 1:44.65 | Ferguson Cheruiyot Rotich; KEN | 1:44.74 | Jonathan Kitilit; KEN | 1:44.78 | Brandon McBride; CAN | 1:44.99 | Amel Tuka; BIH | 1:45.68 | Álvaro de Arriba; ESP | 1:46.16 | Adam Kszczot; POL | 1:46.23 | Kipyegon Bett; KEN | 1:46.93 |
| Men's 1500m | Timothy Cheruiyot; KEN | 3:31.22 | Elijah Motonei Manangoi; KEN | 3:33.79 | Samuel Tefera; ETH | 3:34.84 | Ayanleh Souleiman; DJI | 3:34.87 | Charles Cheboi Simotwo; KEN | 3:35.03 | Charlie da'Vall Grice; GBR | 3:35.72 | Taresa Tolosa; ETH | 3:36.22 | Aman Wote; ETH | 3:36.30 |
| Men's 400mH | Abderrahman Samba; QAT | 47.48 | Karsten Warholm; NOR | 47.82 | Yasmani Copello; TUR | 48.63 | TJ Holmes; USA | 49.00 | Rasmus Mägi; EST | 49.19 | Kerron Clement; USA | 49.48 | Jose Reynaldo Bencosme de Leon; ITA | 49.79 | Nicholas Bett; KEN | 49.95 |
| Men's Pole Vault | Sam Kendricks; USA | 5.84 m | Paweł Wojciechowski; POL | 5.78 m | Raphael Holzdeppe; GER | 5.62 m | Stanley Joseph; FRA | 5.52 m | Konstantinos Filippidis; GRE | 5.52 m | Scott Houston; USA | 5.52 m | Shawnacy Barber; CAN | 5.52 m | Thiago Braz; BRA | NH |
| Men's Long Jump | Luvo Manyonga; RSA | 8.58 m | Juan Miguel Echevarría; CUB | 8.53 m | Ruswahl Samaai; RSA | 8.34 m | Jeff Henderson; USA | 8.19 m | Tajay Gayle; JAM | 8.17 m | Henry Frayne; AUS | 8.15 m | Marquis Dendy; USA | 8.08 m | Maykel Massó; CUB | 7.92 m |
| Men's Discus Throw | Fedrick Dacres; JAM | 68.51 m | Andrius Gudžius; LTU | 68.17 m | Ehsan Hadadi; IRI | 65.93 m | Daniel Ståhl; SWE | 64.84 m | Robert Harting; GER | 64.64 m | Mason Finley; USA | 64.17 m | Lukas Weißhaidinger; AUT | 64.16 m | Robert Urbanek; POL | 64.10 m |
| Women's 200m (−1.7 m/s) | Marie-Josée Ta Lou; CIV | 22.49 | Ivet Lalova-Collio; BUL | 22.64 | Mujinga Kambundji; SUI | 22.76 | Kyra Jefferson; USA | 22.91 | Crystal Emmanuel; CAN | 23.08 | Shericka Jackson; JAM | 23.14 | Felicia Brown-Edwards; USA | 23.19 | Joanna Atkins; USA | 23.29 |
| Women's 100mH (±0.0 m/s) | Sharika Nelvis; USA | 12.76 | Danielle Williams; JAM | 12.82 | Tobi Amusan; NGR | 12.86 | Nadine Visser; NED | 12.90 | Elvira Hrabarenka; BLR | 12.97 | Dawn Harper-Nelson; USA | 13.09 | Laura Valette; FRA | 13.30 | Elisa Maria di Lazzaro; ITA | 13.52 |
| Women's 3000mSC | Hyvin Kiyeng; KEN | 9:04.96 | Celliphine Chepteek Chespol; KEN | 9:05.14 | Norah Jeruto; KEN | 9:07.17 | Emma Coburn; USA | 9:08.13 | Beatrice Chepkoech; KEN | 9:15.85 | Winfred Mutile Yavi; BRN | 9:16.38 | Daisy Jepkemei; KEN | 9:18.44 | Aisha Praught-Leer; JAM | 9:19.33 |
| Women's High Jump | Mariya Lasitskene; ANA | 2.02 m | Mirela Demireva; BUL | 1.94 m | Elena Vallortigara; ITA | 1.94 m | Kateryna Tabashnyk; UKR | 1.94 m | Yuliia Levchenko; UKR | 1.94 m | Vashti Cunningham; USA | 1.94 m | Alessia Trost; ITA | 1.88 m | Levern Spencer; LCA | 1.88 m |
| Women's Discus Throw | Sandra Perković; CRO | 68.93 m | Yaimé Pérez; CUB | 66.62 m | Denia Caballero; CUB | 63.48 m | Anna Rüh; GER | 60.89 m | Nadine Müller; GER | 59.98 m | Whitney Ashley; USA | 59.53 m | Andressa de Morais; BRA | 59.31 m | Daisy Osakue; ITA | 57.66 m |

Oslo
| Event | 1st +8 pts | 2nd +7 pts | 3rd +6 pts | 4th +5 pts | 5th +4 pts | 6th +3 pts | 7th +2 pts | 8th +1 pts |
|---|---|---|---|---|---|---|---|---|
| Men's 200m (+1.0 m/s) | Ramil Guliyev; TUR | 19.90 | Aaron Brown; CAN | 19.98 | Jereem Richards; TTO | 20.19 | Adam Gemili; GBR | 20.21 | Ameer Webb; USA | 20.45 | Jonathan Quarcoo; NOR | 20.79 | Churandy Martina; NED | 20.86 | Dedric Dukes; USA | DQ |
| Men's Mile | Elijah Motonei Manangoi; KEN | 3:56.95 | Sadik Mikhou; BRN | DQ | Taresa Tolosa; ETH | 3:57.92 | Filip Ingebrigtsen; NOR | 3:57.97 | Younéss Essalhi; MAR | 3:58.00 | Henrik Ingebrigtsen; NOR | 3:58.46 | Ryan Gregson; AUS | 3:58.47 | Bethwell Birgen; KEN | 3:59.10 |
| Men's 400mH | Abderrahman Samba; QAT | 47.60 | Karsten Warholm; NOR | 48.22 | Yasmani Copello; TUR | 48.54 | TJ Holmes; USA | 48.64 | Kerron Clement; USA | 49.30 | Rasmus Mägi; EST | 49.35 | Mamadou Kasse Hann; FRA | 49.50 | Thomas Barr; IRL | 49.53 |
| Men's High Jump | Mutaz Essa Barshim; QAT | 2.36 m | Danil Lysenko; ANA | 2.33 m | Donald Thomas; BAH | 2.25 m | Majd Eddin Ghazal; SYR | 2.25 m | Marco Fassinotti; ITA | 2.25 m | Dzmitry Nabokau; BLR | 2.20 m | Brandon Starc; AUS | 2.20 m | Fabian Delryd; SWE | 2.20 m |
| Men's Shot Put | Tom Walsh; NZL | 22.29 m | Ryan Crouser; USA | 22.21 m | Darrell Hill; USA | 21.20 m | David Storl; GER | 20.97 m | Tomáš Staněk; CZE | 20.82 m | Ryan Whiting; USA | 20.25 m | Joe Kovacs; USA | 20.13 m | Marcus Thomsen; NOR | 19.41 m |
| Men's Discus Throw | Andrius Gudžius; LTU | 69.04 m | Ehsan Hadadi; IRI | 67.55 m | Daniel Ståhl; SWE | 67.04 m | Christoph Harting; GER | 65.68 m | Mason Finley; USA | 65.16 m | Philip Milanov; BEL | 64.40 m | Daniel Jasinski; GER | 63.94 m | Fedrick Dacres; JAM | 63.85 m |
| Women's 100m (+1.6 m/s) | Murielle Ahouré-Demps; CIV | 10.91 | Dina Asher-Smith; GBR | 10.92 | Michelle-Lee Ahye; TTO | 11.06 | Blessing Okagbare; NGR | 11.12 | Gina Lückenkemper; GER | 11.16 | Carina Horn; RSA | 11.22 | Ezinne Okparaebo; NOR | 11.24 | Khalifa St. Fort; TTO | 11.28 |
| Women's 400m | Salwa Eid Naser; BRN | 49.98 | Phyllis Francis; USA | 50.47 | Shakima Wimbley; USA | 50.53 | Jessica Beard; USA | 50.57 | Jaide Stepter Baynes; USA | 50.78 | Courtney Okolo; USA | 51.22 | Anyika Onuora; GBR | 51.60 | Floria Guei; FRA | 51.84 |
| Women's 800m | Caster Semenya; RSA | 1:57.25 | Francine Niyonsaba; BDI | 1:58.57 | Habitam Alemu; ETH | 1:58.58 | Nelly Jepkosgei; BRN | 1:58.96 | Laura Muir; GBR | 1:59.09 | Brenda Martinez; USA | 2:00.74 | Selina Rutz-Büchel; SUI | 2:00.78 | Hedda Hynne; NOR | 2:01.46 |
| Women's 400mH | Dalilah Muhammad; USA | 53.65 | Shamier Little; USA | 53.94 | Sage Watson; CAN | 54.55 | Lea Sprunger; SUI | 55.07 | Zuzana Hejnová; CZE | 55.16 | Amalie Iuel; NOR | 55.26 | Yadisleidis Pedroso; ITA | 55.47 | Line Kloster; NOR | 56.48 |
| Women's 3000mSC | Hyvin Kiyeng; KEN | 9:09.63 | Emma Coburn; USA | 9:09.70 | Daisy Jepkemei; KEN | 9:16.87 | Courtney Frerichs; USA | 9:20.84 | Aisha Praught-Leer; JAM | 9:23.33 | Winfred Mutile Yavi; BRN | 9:27.76 | Karoline Bjerkeli Grøvdal; NOR | 9:29.94 | Purity Kirui; KEN | 9:39.23 |
| Women's Pole Vault | Sandi Morris; USA | 4.81 m | Anzhelika Sidorova; ANA | 4.71 m | Angelica Bengtsson; SWE | 4.61 m | Katie Moon; USA | 4.61 m | Holly Bradshaw; GBR | 4.51 m | Yarisley Silva; CUB | 4.26 m | Lene Onsrud Retzius; NOR | 4.26 m | Aikaterini Stefanidi; GRE | NH |
| Women's Triple Jump | Caterine Ibarguen; COL | 14.89 m | Tori Franklin; USA | 14.57 m | Kimberly Williams; JAM | 14.50 m | Shanieka Ricketts; JAM | 14.44 m | Kristin Gierisch; GER | 14.37 m | Olga Rypakova; KAZ | 14.12 m | Olha Saladukha; UKR | 14.02 m | Oda Utsi Onstad; NOR | 13.23 m |
| Women's Javelin Throw | Tatsiana Khaladovich; BLR | 67.47 m | Huihui Lyu; CHN | 65.11 m | Nikola Ogrodníková; CZE | 61.56 m | Sigrid Borge; NOR | 61.11 m | Kara Winger; USA | 60.79 m | Madara Palameika; LAT | 59.26 m | Christin Hussong; GER | 58.53 m | Elizabeth Gleadle; CAN | 55.93 m |

Stockholm
| Event | 1st +8 pts | 2nd +7 pts | 3rd +6 pts | 4th +5 pts | 5th +4 pts | 6th +3 pts | 7th +2 pts | 8th +1 pts |
|---|---|---|---|---|---|---|---|---|
| Men's 200m (+0.9 m/s) | Ramil Guliyev; TUR | 19.92 | Aaron Brown; CAN | 20.07 | Luxolo Adams; RSA | 20.36 | Ameer Webb; USA | 20.41 | Nethaneel Mitchell-Blake; GBR | 20.47 | Churandy Martina; NED | 20.82 | Henrik Larsson; SWE | 20.85 | Steven Gardiner; BAH | 23.35 |
| Men's 1000m | Ferguson Cheruiyot Rotich; KEN | 2:14.88 | Sadik Mikhou; BRN | DQ | Jake Wightman; GBR | 2:16.27 | Adam Kszczot; POL | 2:16.58 | Antoine Gakeme; BDI | 2:16.85 | Kipyegon Bett; KEN | 2:16.98 | Andrew Osagie; GBR | 2:17.18 | Alfred Kipketer; KEN | 2:17.40 |
| Men's 5000m | Selemon Barega; ETH | 13:04.05 | Birhanu Balew; BRN | 13:04.25 | Abadi Hadis; ETH | 13:06.76 | Mohammed Ahmed; CAN | 13:14.88 | Ben True; USA | 13:16.48 | Jacob Kiplimo; UGA | 13:19.66 | Morhad Amdouni; FRA | 13:19.93 | Dawit Wolde; ETH | 13:28.86 |
| Men's 400mH | Abderrahman Samba; QAT | 47.41 | Karsten Warholm; NOR | 47.81 | Yasmani Copello; TUR | 48.91 | Mamadou Kasse Hann; FRA | 49.58 | Jack Green; GBR | 49.73 | Sebastian Rodger; GBR | 49.87 | Rasmus Mägi; EST | 50.11 | Isak Andersson; SWE | 51.16 |
| Men's Pole Vault | Armand Duplantis; SWE | 5.86 m | Sam Kendricks; USA | 5.81 m | Piotr Lisek; POL | 5.76 m | Paweł Wojciechowski; POL | 5.76 m | Shawnacy Barber; CAN | 5.66 m | Raphael Holzdeppe; GER | 5.66 m | Stanley Joseph; FRA | 5.50 m | Bokai Huang; CHN | 5.50 m |
| Men's Long Jump | Juan Miguel Echevarría; CUB | 8.83 m | Jeff Henderson; USA | 8.39 m | Luvo Manyonga; RSA | 8.25 m | Ruswahl Samaai; RSA | 8.20 m | Thobias Montler; SWE | 8.09 m | Miltiadis Tentoglou; GRE | 8.05 m | Henry Frayne; AUS | 8.04 m | Tyrone Smith; BER | 7.94 m |
| Men's Discus Throw | Fedrick Dacres; JAM | 69.67 m | Andrius Gudžius; LTU | 69.59 m | Ehsan Hadadi; IRI | 67.68 m | Philip Milanov; BEL | 66.51 m | Lukas Weißhaidinger; AUT | 66.25 m | Daniel Ståhl; SWE | 66.16 m | Simon Pettersson; SWE | 65.49 m | Mason Finley; USA | 62.86 m |
| Women's 100m (−0.1 m/s) | Dina Asher-Smith; GBR | 10.93 | Murielle Ahouré-Demps; CIV | 11.03 | Michelle-Lee Ahye; TTO | 11.11 | Gina Lückenkemper; GER | 11.23 | Blessing Okagbare; NGR | 11.29 | Carina Horn; RSA | 11.29 | Khalifa St. Fort; TTO | 11.35 | Irene Ekelund; SWE | 11.77 |
| Women's 400m | Salwa Eid Naser; BRN | 49.84 | Phyllis Francis; USA | 50.07 | Jessica Beard; USA | 50.55 | Shamier Little; USA | 50.82 | Jaide Stepter Baynes; USA | 50.99 | Courtney Okolo; USA | 51.28 | Justyna Święty-Ersetic; POL | 51.34 | Moa Hjelmer; SWE | 53.47 |
| Women's 1500m | Gudaf Tsegay; ETH | 3:57.64 | Laura Muir; GBR | 3:58.53 | Rababe Arafi; MAR | 4:00.28 | Jenny Simpson; USA | 4:00.34 | Nelly Jepkosgei; BRN | 4:01.95 | Meraf Bahta; SWE | DQ | Besu Sado; ETH | 4:02.81 | Linden Hall; AUS | 4:02.89 |
| Women's 100mH (+1.3 m/s) | Brianna McNeal; USA | 12.38 | Danielle Williams; JAM | 12.48 | Alina Talay; BLR | 12.55 | Nadine Visser; NED | 12.71 | Christina Clemons; USA | 12.75 | Dawn Harper-Nelson; USA | 12.80 | Isabelle Pedersen; NOR | 12.82 | Elin Westerlund; SWE | 13.29 |
| Women's High Jump | Mariya Lasitskene; ANA | 2.00 m | Mirela Demireva; BUL | 2.00 m | Erika Kinsey; SWE | 1.94 m | Yuliia Levchenko; UKR | 1.94 m | Alessia Trost; ITA | 1.90 m | Levern Spencer; LCA | 1.90 m | Sofie Skoog; SWE | 1.90 m | Morgan Lake; GBR | 1.90 m |
| Women's Long Jump | Lorraine Ugen; GBR | 6.85 m | Malaika Mihambo; GER | 6.85 m | Christabel Nettey; CAN | 6.83 m | Ivana Vuleta; SRB | 6.81 m | Sha'keela Saunders; USA | 6.72 m | Quanesha Burks; USA | 6.59 m | Sosthene Moguenara-Taroum; GER | 6.58 m | Erica Jarder; SWE | 6.53 m |

Paris
| Event | 1st +8 pts | 2nd +7 pts | 3rd +6 pts | 4th +5 pts | 5th +4 pts | 6th +3 pts | 7th +2 pts | 8th +1 pts |
|---|---|---|---|---|---|---|---|---|
| Men's 100m (+0.8 m/s) | Ronnie Baker; USA | 9.88 | Jimmy Vicaut; FRA | 9.91 | Bingtian Su; CHN | 9.91 | Akani Simbine; RSA | 9.94 | Yohan Blake; JAM | 10.03 | Michael Rodgers; USA | 10.10 | Arthur Cissé; CIV | 10.15 | Jeff Demps; USA | 10.23 |
| Men's 1500m | Timothy Cheruiyot; KEN | 3:29.71 | Ayanleh Souleiman; DJI | 3:31.77 | Charles Cheboi Simotwo; KEN | 3:32.61 | Aman Wote; ETH | 3:32.81 | Jakub Holuša; CZE | 3:32.85 | Filip Ingebrigtsen; NOR | 3:32.87 | Bethwell Birgen; KEN | 3:34.27 | Sadik Mikhou; BRN | DQ |
| Men's 110mH (+1.5 m/s) | Ronald Levy; JAM | 13.18 | Hansle Parchment; JAM | 13.22 | Devon Allen; USA | 13.23 | Antonio Alkana; RSA | 13.32 | Jarret Eaton; USA | 13.40 | Orlando Ortega; ESP | 13.44 | Aurel Manga; FRA | 13.48 | Sergey Shubenkov; RUS | DQ |
| Men's 400mH | Abderrahman Samba; QAT | 46.98 | Kyron McMaster; IVB | 47.54 | Karsten Warholm; NOR | 48.06 | TJ Holmes; USA | 48.30 | Kerron Clement; USA | 48.83 | Bershawn Jackson; USA | 49.16 | Victor Coroller; FRA | 50.03 | Juander Santos; DOM | 50.71 |
| Men's Pole Vault | Sam Kendricks; USA | 5.96 m | Armand Duplantis; SWE | 5.90 m | Renaud Lavillenie; FRA | 5.84 m | Piotr Lisek; POL | 5.84 m | Shawnacy Barber; CAN | 5.84 m | Kurtis Marschall; AUS | 5.70 m | Paweł Wojciechowski; POL | 5.70 m | Axel Chapelle; FRA | 5.60 m |
| Men's Discus Throw | Fedrick Dacres; JAM | 67.01 m | Christoph Harting; GER | 64.80 m | Robert Urbanek; POL | 64.68 m | Piotr Małachowski; POL | 64.47 m | Lukas Weißhaidinger; AUT | 64.44 m | Ehsan Hadadi; IRI | 64.36 m | Philip Milanov; BEL | 64.00 m | Daniel Jasinski; GER | 62.40 m |
| Women's 200m (+1.1 m/s) | Shericka Jackson; JAM | 22.05 | Jenna Prandini; USA | 22.30 | Marie-Josée Ta Lou; CIV | 22.50 | Jamile Samuel; NED | 22.63 | Kyra Jefferson; USA | 22.69 | Kimberlyn Duncan; USA | 22.95 | Tatjana Pinto; GER | 23.35 | Brigitte Ntiamoah; FRA | 23.48 |
| Women's 400m | Salwa Eid Naser; BRN | 49.55 | Jessica Beard; USA | 50.39 | Phyllis Francis; USA | 50.50 | Shakima Wimbley; USA | 50.81 | Stephenie Ann McPherson; JAM | 50.85 | Courtney Okolo; USA | 51.15 | Floria Guei; FRA | 51.71 | Anastasia Natalie le-Roy; JAM | 52.44 |
| Women's 800m | Caster Semenya; RSA | 1:54.25 | Francine Niyonsaba; BDI | 1:55.86 | Ajee Wilson; USA | 1:57.11 | Habitam Alemu; ETH | 1:57.17 | Natoya Goule-Toppin; JAM | 1:57.69 | Charlene Lipsey; USA | 1:58.05 | Emily Cherotich Tuei; KEN | 1:58.99 | Rénelle Lamote; FRA | 1:59.25 |
| Women's 3000mSC | Beatrice Chepkoech; KEN | 8:59.36 | Celliphine Chepteek Chespol; KEN | 9:01.82 | Hyvin Kiyeng; KEN | 9:03.86 | Norah Jeruto; KEN | 9:04.17 | Winfred Mutile Yavi; BRN | 9:12.74 | Rosefline Chepngetich; KEN | 9:17.08 | Daisy Jepkemei; KEN | 9:17.35 | Aisha Praught-Leer; JAM | 9:20.89 |
| Women's High Jump | Mariya Lasitskene; ANA | 2.04 m | Nafissatou Thiam; BEL | 1.97 m | Yuliia Levchenko; UKR | 1.97 m | Mirela Demireva; BUL | 1.94 m | Elena Vallortigara; ITA | 1.94 m | Kateryna Tabashnyk; UKR | 1.94 m | Marie-Laurence Jungfleisch; GER | 1.94 m | Erika Kinsey; SWE | 1.90 m |
| Women's Triple Jump | Caterine Ibarguen; COL | 14.83 m | Kimberly Williams; JAM | 14.56 m | Tori Franklin; USA | 14.49 m | Kristin Gierisch; GER | 14.42 m | Shanieka Ricketts; JAM | 14.38 m | Ana Peleteiro; ESP | 14.31 m | Rouguy Diallo; FRA | 14.27 m | Olga Rypakova; KAZ | 14.25 m |
| Women's Discus Throw | Sandra Perković; CRO | 68.60 m | Yaimé Pérez; CUB | 66.55 m | Denia Caballero; CUB | 63.13 m | Andressa de Morais; BRA | 62.93 m | Anna Rüh; GER | 62.65 m | Claudine Vita; GER | 62.31 m | Nadine Müller; GER | 60.28 m | Whitney Ashley; USA | 57.33 m |

Lausanne
| Event | 1st +8 pts | 2nd +7 pts | 3rd +6 pts | 4th +5 pts | 5th +4 pts | 6th +3 pts | 7th +2 pts | 8th +1 pts |
|---|---|---|---|---|---|---|---|---|
| Men's 200m (+0.4 m/s) | Noah Lyles; USA | 19.69 | Michael Norman; USA | 19.88 | Alex Quiñónez; ECU | 20.08 | Rai Benjamin; USA | 20.16 | Paulo André Camilo; BRA | 20.33 | Isiah Young; USA | 20.43 | Alex Wilson; SUI | 20.65 | Alonso Edward; PAN | 20.86 |
| Men's 5000m | Birhanu Balew; BRN | 13:01.09 | Selemon Barega; ETH | 13:02.67 | Abadi Hadis; ETH | 13:03.62 | Getaneh Molla; ETH | 13:04.04 | Richard Yator; KEN | 13:04.97 | Muktar Edris; ETH | 13:06.24 | Telahun Haile Bekele; ETH | 13:07.02 | Aron Kifle; ERI | 13:07.59 |
| Men's 110mH (+0.6 m/s) | Sergey Shubenkov; RUS | 12.95 | Devon Allen; USA | 13.29 | Pascal Martinot-Lagarde; FRA | 13.30 | Balázs Baji; HUN | 13.36 | Omar McLeod; JAM | 13.41 | Aries Merritt; USA | 13.44 | Jason Joseph; SUI | 13.54 | |
| Men's 400mH | Abderrahman Samba; QAT | 47.42 | Karsten Warholm; NOR | 47.94 | Yasmani Copello; TUR | 48.85 | TJ Holmes; USA | 48.94 | Rasmus Mägi; EST | 49.04 | Bershawn Jackson; USA | 49.31 | Jack Green; GBR | 49.52 | Kyron McMaster; IVB | DNF |
| Men's High Jump | Danil Lysenko; ANA | DQ | Brandon Starc; AUS | 2.29 m | Jeron Robinson; USA | 2.29 m | Bryan McBride; USA | 2.25 m | Donald Thomas; BAH | 2.25 m | Majd Eddin Ghazal; SYR | 2.25 m | Maksim Nedasekau; BLR | 2.25 m | Trevor Barry; BAH | 2.25 m |
| Men's Triple Jump | Christian Taylor; USA | 17.62 m | Pedro Pichardo; POR | 17.61 m | Chris Benard; USA | 16.92 m | Alexis Copello; AZE | 16.90 m | Donald Scott; USA | 16.90 m | Simo Lipsanen; FIN | 16.81 m | Elvijs Misāns; LAT | 16.35 m | Alexsandro Melo; BRA | NM |
| Men's Shot Put | Tom Walsh; NZL | 21.92 m | Darlan Romani; BRA | 21.38 m | Michał Haratyk; POL | 21.21 m | Darrell Hill; USA | 21.04 m | Tomáš Staněk; CZE | 20.99 m | Ryan Whiting; USA | 20.91 m | Franck Elemba; CGO | 20.52 m | Stipe Žunić; CRO | 20.31 m |
| Women's 100m (+1.3 m/s) | Marie-Josée Ta Lou; CIV | 10.90 | Elaine Thompson-Herah; JAM | 10.99 | Jenna Prandini; USA | 11.00 | Dafne Schippers; NED | 11.02 | Mujinga Kambundji; SUI | 11.03 | Murielle Ahouré-Demps; CIV | 11.03 | Blessing Okagbare; NGR | DNS | |
| Women's 400m | Salwa Eid Naser; BRN | 49.78 | Jessica Beard; USA | 50.40 | Shakima Wimbley; USA | 50.58 | Jaide Stepter Baynes; USA | 50.63 | Stephenie Ann McPherson; JAM | 50.84 | Anastasia Natalie le-Roy; JAM | 51.12 | Christine Botlogetswe; BOT | 51.37 | Courtney Okolo; USA | 51.63 |
| Women's 800m | Francine Niyonsaba; BDI | 1:57.80 | Ajee Wilson; USA | 1:58.20 | Habitam Alemu; ETH | 1:58.38 | Margaret Nyairera Wambui; KEN | 1:59.03 | Raevyn Rogers; USA | 2:00.12 | Nelly Jepkosgei; BRN | 2:00.26 | Eunice Jepkoech Sum; KEN | 2:00.33 | Lynsey Sharp; GBR | 2:01.02 |
| Women's 1500m | Shelby Houlihan; USA | 3:57.34 | Laura Muir; GBR | 3:58.18 | Sifan Hassan; NED | 3:58.39 | Gudaf Tsegay; ETH | 3:59.07 | Rababe Arafi; MAR | 3:59.15 | Caster Semenya; RSA | 4:00.44 | Laura Weightman; GBR | 4:01.76 | Eilish McColgan; GBR | 4:01.98 |
| Women's 400mH | Shamier Little; USA | 53.41 | Janieve Russell; JAM | 53.46 | Georganne Moline; USA | 53.90 | Dalilah Muhammad; USA | 54.61 | Ashley Spencer; USA | 54.74 | Lea Sprunger; SUI | 54.79 | Cassandra Tate; USA | 55.45 | Sara Slott Petersen; DEN | 1:30.61 |
| Women's Pole Vault | Aikaterini Stefanidi; GRE | 4.82 m | Jennifer Suhr; USA | 4.82 m | Anzhelika Sidorova; ANA | 4.82 m | Eliza McCartney; NZL | 4.72 m | Sandi Morris; USA | 4.72 m | Angelica Bengtsson; SWE | 4.72 m | Yarisley Silva; CUB | 4.72 m | Katie Moon; USA | 4.52 m |
| Women's Long Jump | Malaika Mihambo; GER | 6.90 m | Ivana Vuleta; SRB | 6.90 m | Caterine Ibarguen; COL | 6.77 m | Ese Brume; NGR | 6.66 m | Shara Proctor; GBR | 6.62 m | Brooke Buschkuehl; AUS | 6.62 m | Lorraine Ugen; GBR | 6.48 m | Tianna Madison; USA | DNS |
| Women's Javelin Throw | Nikola Ogrodníková; CZE | 65.02 m | Liu Shiying; CHN | 64.46 m | Martina Ratej; SLO | 63.28 m | Kara Winger; USA | 63.02 m | Sigrid Borge; NOR | 61.12 m | Tatsiana Khaladovich; BLR | 61.00 m | Christin Hussong; GER | 59.94 m | Madara Palameika; LAT | 59.15 m |

Rabat
| Event | 1st +8 pts | 2nd +7 pts | 3rd +6 pts | 4th +5 pts | 5th +4 pts | 6th +3 pts | 7th +2 pts | 8th +1 pts |
|---|---|---|---|---|---|---|---|---|
| Men's 100m (−0.4 m/s) | Christian Coleman; USA | 9.98 | Ronnie Baker; USA | 9.98 | Noah Lyles; USA | 9.99 | Michael Rodgers; USA | 10.01 | Reece Prescod; GBR | 10.09 | Chijindu Ujah; GBR | 10.19 | Yoshihide Kiryu; JPN | 10.20 | Arthur Cissé; CIV | 10.22 |
| Men's 400m | Akeem Bloomfield; JAM | 44.33 | Abdalelah Haroun; QAT | 44.69 | Matthew Hudson-Smith; GBR | 44.79 | Luguelín Santos; DOM | 44.80 | Paul Dedewo; USA | 44.82 | Michael Cherry; USA | 45.40 | | |
| Men's 1500m | Brahim Kaazouzi; MAR | 3:33.22 | Filip Ingebrigtsen; NOR | 3:33.40 | Ayanleh Souleiman; DJI | 3:33.42 | Jakub Holuša; CZE | 3:33.80 | Charlie da'Vall Grice; GBR | 3:34.20 | Ryan Gregson; AUS | 3:34.38 | Aman Wote; ETH | 3:34.39 | Charles Cheboi Simotwo; KEN | 3:34.75 |
| Men's 3000m | Yomif Kejelcha; ETH | 7:32.93 | Birhanu Balew; BRN | 7:34.26 | Stewart McSweyn; AUS | 7:34.79 | Paul Chelimo; USA | 7:34.83 | Muktar Edris; ETH | 7:36.13 | Hagos Gebrhiwet; ETH | 7:36.49 | Ryan Hill; USA | 7:36.81 | Eric Jenkins; USA | 7:38.19 |
| Men's 3000mSC | Benjamin Kigen; KEN | 8:06.19 | Chala Beyo; ETH | 8:07.27 | Soufiane el Bakkali; MAR | 8:09.58 | Hillary Bor; USA | 8:12.20 | Matthew Hughes; CAN | 8:13.13 | Abraham Kibiwot; KEN | 8:14.35 | Ibrahim Ezzaydouni; ESP | 8:14.62 | Nicholas Kiptonui Bett; KEN | 8:17.83 |
| Men's Pole Vault | Sam Kendricks; USA | 5.86 m | Paweł Wojciechowski; POL | 5.80 m | Timur Morgunov; ANA | 5.80 m | Shawnacy Barber; CAN | 5.60 m | Thiago Braz; BRA | 5.60 m | Konstantinos Filippidis; GRE | 5.60 m | Bokai Huang; CHN | 5.60 m | Scott Houston; USA | 5.45 m |
| Men's Javelin Throw | Magnus Kirt; EST | 89.75 m | Andreas Hofmann; GER | 88.58 m | Jakub Vadlejch; CZE | 85.31 m | Thomas Röhler; GER | 85.19 m | Neeraj Chopra; IND | 83.32 m | Ahmed Bader Magour; QAT | 83.30 m | Keshorn Walcott; TTO | 83.26 m | Andrian Mardare; MDA | 81.28 m |
| Women's 200m (−0.5 m/s) | Shaunae Miller-Uibo; BAH | 22.29 | Dina Asher-Smith; GBR | 22.40 | Jenna Prandini; USA | 22.60 | Gabrielle Thomas; USA | 22.70 | Murielle Ahouré-Demps; CIV | 22.70 | Jodie Williams; GBR | 23.26 | Blessing Okagbare; NGR | 23.42 | Shashalee Forbes; JAM | 23.51 |
| Women's 800m | Francine Niyonsaba; BDI | 1:57.90 | Natoya Goule-Toppin; JAM | 1:58.33 | Rababe Arafi; MAR | 1:58.84 | Margaret Nyairera Wambui; KEN | 1:59.09 | Emily Cherotich Tuei; KEN | 1:59.19 | Malika Akkaoui; MAR | 1:59.27 | Lynsey Sharp; GBR | 1:59.86 | Laura Roesler; USA | 2:00.56 |
| Women's 5000m | Hellen Obiri; KEN | 14:21.75 | Sifan Hassan; NED | 14:22.34 | Letesenbet Gidey; ETH | 14:23.14 | Senbere Teferi; ETH | 14:23.33 | Agnes Jebet Tirop; KEN | 14:24.24 | Genzebe Dibaba; ETH | 14:42.98 | Eilish McColgan; GBR | 14:52.83 | Caroline Chepkoech Kipkirui; KEN | 14:55.63 |
| Women's 100mH (+0.1 m/s) | Brianna McNeal; USA | 12.51 | Sharika Nelvis; USA | 12.58 | Christina Clemons; USA | 12.72 | Dawn Harper-Nelson; USA | 12.86 | Tobi Amusan; NGR | 12.87 | Cindy Roleder; GER | 12.87 | Pamela Dutkiewicz-Emmerich; GER | 12.89 | Yanique Thompson; JAM | 12.93 |
| Women's High Jump | Mirela Demireva; BUL | 1.94 m | Yuliia Levchenko; UKR | 1.94 m | Mariya Lasitskene; ANA | 1.90 m | Kateryna Tabashnyk; UKR | 1.90 m | Morgan Lake; GBR | 1.90 m | Sofie Skoog; SWE | 1.90 m | Marie-Laurence Jungfleisch; GER | 1.90 m | Oksana Okuneva; UKR | 1.90 m |
| Women's Triple Jump | Caterine Ibarguen; COL | 14.96 m | Kimberly Williams; JAM | 14.47 m | Tori Franklin; USA | 14.42 m | Gabriela Petrova; BUL | 14.40 m | Nubia Soares; BRA | 14.30 m | Ana Peleteiro; ESP | 14.29 m | Elena Andreea Taloș; ROU | 14.15 m | Olga Rypakova; KAZ | 13.83 m |
| Women's Shot Put | Christina Schwanitz; GER | 19.40 m | Aliona Dubitskaya; BLR | 19.21 m | Valerie Adams; NZL | 18.93 m | Raven Saunders; USA | 18.51 m | Brittany Crew; CAN | 18.25 m | Jessica Ramsey; USA | 18.17 m | Fanny Roos; SWE | 18.06 m | Danniel Thomas-Dodd; JAM | 18.04 m |

Monaco
| Event | 1st +8 pts | 2nd +7 pts | 3rd +6 pts | 4th +5 pts | 5th +4 pts | 6th +3 pts | 7th +2 pts | 8th +1 pts |
|---|---|---|---|---|---|---|---|---|
| Men's 200m (+0.9 m/s) | Noah Lyles; USA | 19.65 | Ramil Guliyev; TUR | 19.99 | Alex Quiñónez; ECU | 20.03 | Alonso Edward; PAN | 20.15 | Jereem Richards; TTO | 20.16 | Aaron Brown; CAN | 20.17 | Luxolo Adams; RSA | 20.65 | Ameer Webb; USA | 20.77 |
| Men's 1500m | Timothy Cheruiyot; KEN | 3:28.41 | Elijah Motonei Manangoi; KEN | 3:29.64 | Filip Ingebrigtsen; NOR | 3:30.01 | Jakob Ingebrigtsen; NOR | 3:31.18 | Ayanleh Souleiman; DJI | 3:31.19 | Brahim Kaazouzi; MAR | 3:31.62 | Matthew Centrowitz Jr. USA | 3:31.77 | Aman Wote; ETH | 3:31.90 |
| Men's 110mH (−0.2 m/s) | Sergey Shubenkov; RUS | 13.07 | Orlando Ortega; ESP | 13.18 | Pascal Martinot-Lagarde; FRA | 13.20 | Hansle Parchment; JAM | 13.21 | Devon Allen; USA | 13.38 | Balázs Baji; HUN | 13.38 | Aries Merritt; USA | 13.49 | Kevin Mayer; FRA | 13.82 |
| Men's 3000mSC | Soufiane el Bakkali; MAR | 7:58.15 | Evan Jager; USA | 8:01.02 | Conseslus Kipruto; KEN | 8:09.78 | Benjamin Kigen; KEN | 8:09.98 | Hillary Bor; USA | 8:14.21 | Abraham Kibiwot; KEN | 8:17.40 | Kennedy Njiru; KEN | 8:18.04 | Ibrahim Ezzaydouni; ESP | 8:20.22 |
| Men's High Jump | Danil Lysenko; ANA | DQ | Wang Yu; CHN | 2.30 m | Majd Eddin Ghazal; SYR | 2.27 m | Naoto Tobe; JPN | 2.27 m | Gianmarco Tamberi; ITA | 2.27 m | Donald Thomas; BAH | 2.27 m | Michael Mason; CAN | 2.27 m | Bryan McBride; USA | 2.24 m |
| Men's Triple Jump | Christian Taylor; USA | 17.86 m | Pedro Pichardo; POR | 17.67 m | Omar Craddock; USA | 17.37 m | Chris Benard; USA | 17.26 m | Donald Scott; USA | 17.02 m | Jean-Marc Pontvianne; FRA | 16.71 m | Harold Correa; FRA | 16.46 m | Nelson Évora; POR | 16.24 m |
| Men's Shot Put | Ryan Crouser; USA | 22.05 m | Darrell Hill; USA | 21.72 m | Darlan Romani; BRA | 21.70 m | Michał Haratyk; POL | 21.59 m | Tom Walsh; NZL | 21.49 m | David Storl; GER | 21.41 m | Tomáš Staněk; CZE | 21.24 m | Curtis Jensen; USA | 20.57 m |
| Women's 100m (+0.1 m/s) | Marie-Josée Ta Lou; CIV | 10.89 | Murielle Ahouré-Demps; CIV | 11.01 | Elaine Thompson-Herah; JAM | 11.02 | Jenna Prandini; USA | 11.09 | Dafne Schippers; NED | 11.12 | Mujinga Kambundji; SUI | 11.15 | Carina Horn; RSA | 11.21 | Blessing Okagbare; NGR | 11.32 |
| Women's 400m | Shaunae Miller-Uibo; BAH | 48.97 | Salwa Eid Naser; BRN | 49.08 | Shakima Wimbley; USA | 50.85 | Phyllis Francis; USA | 51.05 | Anita Horvat; SLO | 51.22 | Libania Grenot; ITA | 51.56 | Jessica Beard; USA | 51.58 | Floria Guei; FRA | 51.66 |
| Women's 800m | Caster Semenya; RSA | 1:54.60 | Francine Niyonsaba; BDI | 1:55.96 | Natoya Goule-Toppin; JAM | 1:56.15 | Ajee Wilson; USA | 1:56.45 | Habitam Alemu; ETH | 1:56.71 | Rababe Arafi; MAR | 1:57.47 | Raevyn Rogers; USA | 1:57.69 | Charlene Lipsey; USA | 1:58.42 |
| Women's 3000mSC | Beatrice Chepkoech; KEN | 8:44.32 | Courtney Frerichs; USA | 9:00.85 | Hyvin Kiyeng; KEN | 9:04.41 | Emma Coburn; USA | 9:05.06 | Norah Jeruto; KEN | 9:07.20 | Peruth Chemutai; UGA | 9:07.94 | Rosefline Chepngetich; KEN | 9:08.23 | Daisy Jepkemei; KEN | 9:10.71 |
| Women's Pole Vault | Anzhelika Sidorova; ANA | 4.85 m | Aikaterini Stefanidi; GRE | 4.80 m | Yarisley Silva; CUB | 4.80 m | Sandi Morris; USA | 4.80 m | Jennifer Suhr; USA | 4.75 m | Katie Moon; USA | 4.75 m | Eliza McCartney; NZL | 4.75 m | Ninon Chapelle; FRA | 4.75 m |
| Women's Shot Put | Lijiao Gong; CHN | 20.31 m | Raven Saunders; USA | 19.67 m | Christina Schwanitz; GER | 19.51 m | Valerie Adams; NZL | 19.31 m | Maggie Ewen; USA | 18.62 m | Paulina Guba; POL | 18.54 m | Michelle Carter; USA | 18.04 m | Danniel Thomas-Dodd; JAM | 17.74 m |

London
| Event | 1st +8 pts | 2nd +7 pts | 3rd +6 pts | 4th +5 pts | 5th +4 pts | 6th +3 pts | 7th +2 pts | 8th +1 pts |
|---|---|---|---|---|---|---|---|---|
| Men's 100m (+0.1 m/s) | Ronnie Baker; USA | 9.90 | Zharnel Hughes; GBR | 9.93 | Akani Simbine; RSA | 9.94 | Yohan Blake; JAM | 9.95 | Michael Rodgers; USA | 9.98 | Tyquendo Tracey; JAM | 9.98 | Isiah Young; USA | 10.01 | Zhenye Xie; CHN | 10.01 |
| Men's 400m | Abdalelah Haroun; QAT | 44.07 | Paul Dedewo; USA | 44.43 | Kirani James; GRN | 44.50 | Baboloki Thebe; BOT | 44.54 | Abderrahman Samba; QAT | 44.62 | Matthew Hudson-Smith; GBR | 44.63 | Nathon Allen; JAM | 44.72 | Nathan Strother; USA | 45.17 |
| Men's 800m | Emmanuel Kipkurui Korir; KEN | 1:42.05 | Clayton Murphy; USA | 1:43.12 | Wyclife Kinyamal; KEN | 1:43.12 | Nijel Amos; BOT | 1:43.29 | Jake Wightman; GBR | 1:44.61 | Adam Kszczot; POL | 1:44.72 | Guy Learmonth; GBR | 1:44.73 | Daniel Rowden; GBR | 1:44.97 |
| Men's 5000m | Paul Chelimo; USA | 13:14.01 | Muktar Edris; ETH | 13:14.35 | Yomif Kejelcha; ETH | 13:14.39 | Birhanu Balew; BRN | 13:16.04 | Hagos Gebrhiwet; ETH | 13:16.39 | Cyrus Rutto; KEN | DQ | Mohammed Ahmed; CAN | 13:16.82 | Richard Yator; KEN | 13:17.98 |
| Men's Pole Vault | Sam Kendricks; USA | 5.92 m | Renaud Lavillenie; FRA | 5.86 m | Armand Duplantis; SWE | 5.86 m | Kurtis Marschall; AUS | 5.80 m | Shawnacy Barber; CAN | 5.71 m | Charlie Myers; GBR | 5.46 m | Thiago Braz; BRA | 5.46 m | Adam Hague; GBR | 5.46 m |
| Men's Long Jump | Luvo Manyonga; RSA | 8.58 m | Ruswahl Samaai; RSA | 8.42 m | Jarrion Lawson; USA | 8.25 m | Henry Frayne; AUS | 8.24 m | Jeff Henderson; USA | 8.20 m | Dan Bramble; GBR | 8.15 m | Marquis Dendy; USA | 8.12 m | Timothy Duckworth; GBR | 7.76 m |
| Women's 200m (+0.9 m/s) | Jenna Prandini; USA | 22.16 | Gabrielle Thomas; USA | 22.19 | Shericka Jackson; JAM | 22.22 | Dina Asher-Smith; GBR | 22.25 | Marie-Josée Ta Lou; CIV | 22.34 | Jamile Samuel; NED | 22.37 | Dafne Schippers; NED | 22.42 | Jeneba Tarmoh; USA | 22.80 |
| Women's Mile | Sifan Hassan; NED | 4:14.71 | Gudaf Tsegay; ETH | 4:16.14 | Hellen Obiri; KEN | 4:16.15 | Jenny Simpson; USA | 4:17.30 | Laura Muir; GBR | 4:19.28 | Laura Weightman; GBR | 4:20.49 | Winny Chebet; KEN | 4:20.51 | Kate Grace; USA | 4:20.70 |
| Women's 100mH (+0.6 m/s) | Kendra Harrison; USA | 12.36 | Brianna McNeal; USA | 12.47 | Sharika Nelvis; USA | 12.51 | Danielle Williams; JAM | 12.55 | Christina Clemons; USA | 12.57 | Queen Claye; USA | 12.63 | Tobi Amusan; NGR | 12.68 | Isabelle Pedersen; NOR | 12.73 |
| Women's 400mH | Shamier Little; USA | 53.95 | Janieve Russell; JAM | 53.96 | Dalilah Muhammad; USA | 54.86 | Georganne Moline; USA | 55.47 | Wenda Nel; RSA | 55.67 | Ristananna Tracey; JAM | 56.07 | Eilidh Doyle; GBR | 56.18 | Sage Watson; CAN | 56.21 |
| Women's High Jump | Mariya Lasitskene; ANA | 2.04 m | Elena Vallortigara; ITA | 2.02 m | Morgan Lake; GBR | 1.91 m | Vashti Cunningham; USA | 1.91 m | Erika Kinsey; SWE | 1.91 m | Alessia Trost; ITA | 1.91 m | Sofie Skoog; SWE | 1.91 m | Yuliia Levchenko; UKR | 1.91 m |
| Women's Long Jump | Shara Proctor; GBR | 6.91 m | Lorraine Ugen; GBR | 6.88 m | Brooke Buschkuehl; AUS | 6.76 m | Sha'keela Saunders; USA | 6.74 m | Katarina Johnson-Thompson; GBR | 6.70 m | Jazmin Sawyers; GBR | 6.62 m | Khaddi Sagnia; SWE | 6.58 m | Christabel Nettey; CAN | 6.54 m |
| Women's Discus Throw | Sandra Perković; CRO | 67.24 m | Yaimé Pérez; CUB | 64.63 m | Denia Caballero; CUB | 63.91 m | Andressa de Morais; BRA | 62.71 m | Gia Lewis-Smallwood; USA | 61.09 m | Xinyue Su; CHN | 60.65 m | Jade Lally; GBR | 59.13 m | Whitney Ashley; USA | 58.24 m |
| Women's Javelin Throw | Huihui Lyu; CHN | 65.54 m | Nikola Ogrodníková; CZE | 65.36 m | Kelsey-Lee Barber; AUS | 64.11 m | Martina Ratej; SLO | 62.89 m | Kara Winger; USA | 60.84 m | Sunette Viljoen; RSA | 60.34 m | Sigrid Borge; NOR | 57.12 m | Madara Palameika; LAT | 54.01 m |

Birmingham
| Event | 1st +8 pts | 2nd +7 pts | 3rd +6 pts | 4th +5 pts | 5th +4 pts | 6th +3 pts | 7th +2 pts | 8th +1 pts |
|---|---|---|---|---|---|---|---|---|
| Men's 100m (−0.5 m/s) | Christian Coleman; USA | 9.94 | Reece Prescod; GBR | 9.94 | Noah Lyles; USA | 9.98 | Yohan Blake; JAM | 9.99 | Zharnel Hughes; GBR | 10.05 | Akani Simbine; RSA | 10.09 | Tyquendo Tracey; JAM | 10.15 | Chijindu Ujah; GBR | 10.17 |
| Men's 400m | Fred Kerley; USA | 45.54 | Matthew Hudson-Smith; GBR | 45.59 | Paul Dedewo; USA | 45.62 | Christian Taylor; USA | 45.78 | Luguelín Santos; DOM | 45.81 | Jonathan Borlée; BEL | 46.27 | Baboloki Thebe; BOT | 46.35 | Dwayne Cowan; GBR | 46.94 |
| Men's 800m | Emmanuel Kipkurui Korir; KEN | 1:42.79 | Jonathan Kitilit; KEN | 1:43.53 | Elijah Motonei Manangoi; KEN | 1:44.15 | Ferguson Cheruiyot Rotich; KEN | 1:44.44 | Marcin Lewandowski; POL | 1:44.75 | Adam Kszczot; POL | 1:44.97 | Jake Wightman; GBR | 1:45.00 | Erik Sowinski; USA | 1:45.68 |
| Men's 110mH (+1.3 m/s) | Orlando Ortega; ESP | 13.08 | Ronald Levy; JAM | 13.22 | Pascal Martinot-Lagarde; FRA | 13.27 | Freddie Crittenden; USA | 13.27 | Andrew Pozzi; GBR | 13.35 | Gabriel Constantino; BRA | 13.41 | Johnathan Cabral; CAN | 13.46 | David King; GBR | 13.53 |
| Men's 3000mSC | Conseslus Kipruto; KEN | 8:14.33 | Chala Beyo; ETH | 8:14.61 | Nicholas Kiptonui Bett; KEN | 8:16.44 | Leonard Kipkemoi Bett; KEN | 8:16.97 | Benjamin Kigen; KEN | 8:17.43 | Abraham Kibiwot; KEN | 8:22.81 | Matthew Hughes; CAN | 8:23.67 | Hillary Bor; USA | 8:30.04 |
| Men's High Jump | Brandon Starc; AUS | 2.33 m | Michael Mason; CAN | 2.30 m | Jeron Robinson; USA | 2.30 m | Naoto Tobe; JPN | 2.24 m | Mathew Sawe; KEN | 2.20 m | Mateusz Przybylko; GER | 2.20 m | Bryan McBride; USA | 2.20 m | Chris Baker; GBR | 2.16 m |
| Men's Javelin Throw | Andreas Hofmann; GER | 89.82 m | Julian Weber; GER | 86.63 m | Magnus Kirt; EST | 85.31 m | Thomas Röhler; GER | 84.33 m | Marcin Krukowski; POL | 83.96 m | Gatis Čakšs; LAT | 80.96 m | Petr Frydrych; CZE | 79.86 m | |
| Women's 200m (+0.4 m/s) | Shaunae Miller-Uibo; BAH | 22.15 | Dina Asher-Smith; GBR | 22.31 | Dafne Schippers; NED | 22.41 | Shericka Jackson; JAM | 22.55 | Jenna Prandini; USA | 22.58 | Gabrielle Thomas; USA | 22.85 | Marie-Josée Ta Lou; CIV | 22.88 | Kyra Jefferson; USA | 23.26 |
| Women's 1500m | Sifan Hassan; NED | 4:00.60 | Gudaf Tsegay; ETH | 4:01.03 | Sofia Ennaoui; POL | 4:02.06 | Axumawit Embaye; ETH | 4:02.44 | Sarah McDonald; GBR | 4:03.17 | Winny Chebet; KEN | 4:03.64 | Marta Pen Freitas; POR | 4:03.99 | Kate Grace; USA | 4:04.64 |
| Women's 3000m | Agnes Jebet Tirop; KEN | 8:32.21 | Lilian Kasait Rengeruk; KEN | 8:33.43 | Hellen Obiri; KEN | 8:36.26 | Eilish McColgan; GBR | 8:38.49 | Melissa Courtney-Bryant; GBR | 8:39.20 | Konstanze Klosterhalfen; GER | 8:41.37 | Lonah Chemtai Salpeter; ISR | 8:42.88 | Ejgayehu Taye; ETH | 8:44.13 |
| Women's 400mH | Lea Sprunger; SUI | 54.86 | Janieve Russell; JAM | 54.91 | Meghan Beesley; GBR | 55.83 | Eilidh Doyle; GBR | 56.61 | Sage Watson; CAN | 57.11 | Wenda Nel; RSA | 57.51 | Georganne Moline; USA | DNF | |
| Women's Pole Vault | Sandi Morris; USA | 4.62 m | Aikaterini Stefanidi; GRE | 4.52 m | Nikoleta Kyriakopoulou; GRE | 4.40 m | Katie Moon; USA | 4.40 m | Holly Bradshaw; GBR | 4.40 m | Ninon Chapelle; FRA | 4.40 m | Angelica Bengtsson; SWE | NH | Eliza McCartney; NZL | NH |
| Women's Long Jump | Malaika Mihambo; GER | 6.96 m | Caterine Ibarguen; COL | 6.80 m | Shara Proctor; GBR | 6.70 m | Lorraine Ugen; GBR | 6.69 m | Jazmin Sawyers; GBR | 6.67 m | Christabel Nettey; CAN | 6.54 m | Katarina Johnson-Thompson; GBR | 6.41 m | Sha'keela Saunders; USA | 6.38 m |
| Women's Shot Put | Christina Schwanitz; GER | 18.20 m | Paulina Guba; POL | 17.92 m | Melissa Boekelman; NED | 17.78 m | Danniel Thomas-Dodd; JAM | 17.72 m | Sophie McKinna; GBR | 17.62 m | Michelle Carter; USA | 17.39 m | Fanny Roos; SWE | 17.36 m | Klaudia Kardasz; POL | 16.79 m |

Zurich
| Event | 1st ⠀ | 2nd ⠀ | 3rd ⠀ | 4th ⠀ | 5th ⠀ | 6th ⠀ | 7th ⠀ | 8th ⠀ |
|---|---|---|---|---|---|---|---|---|
| Men's 200m (−0.2 m/s) | Noah Lyles; USA | 19.67 | Ramil Guliyev; TUR | 19.98 | Jereem Richards; TTO | 20.04 | Aaron Brown; CAN | 20.14 | Alex Quiñónez; ECU | 20.34 | Alex Wilson; SUI | 20.40 | Luxolo Adams; RSA | 20.51 | Nethaneel Mitchell-Blake; GBR | 20.53 |
| Men's 400m | Fred Kerley; USA | 44.80 | Nathan Strother; USA | 44.93 | Matthew Hudson-Smith; GBR | 44.95 | Paul Dedewo; USA | 45.18 | Baboloki Thebe; BOT | 45.41 | Luguelín Santos; DOM | 46.17 | Pieter Conradie; RSA | 47.37 | Steven Gardiner; BAH | DNF |
| Men's 1500m | Timothy Cheruiyot; KEN | 3:30.27 | Elijah Motonei Manangoi; KEN | 3:31.16 | Ayanleh Souleiman; DJI | 3:31.24 | Abdelaati Iguider; MAR | 3:31.59 | Brahim Kaazouzi; MAR | 3:33.82 | Aman Wote; ETH | 3:34.05 | Filip Ingebrigtsen; NOR | 3:34.13 | Samuel Tefera; ETH | 3:37.49 |
| Men's 400mH | Kyron McMaster; IVB | 48.08 | Karsten Warholm; NOR | 48.10 | Yasmani Copello; TUR | 48.73 | Rasmus Mägi; EST | 49.28 | Cornel Fredericks; RSA | 49.96 | Jose Reynaldo Bencosme de Leon; ITA | 50.01 | Bershawn Jackson; USA | 50.63 | TJ Holmes; USA | 51.39 |
| Men's 3000mSC | Conseslus Kipruto; KEN | 8:10.15 | Soufiane el Bakkali; MAR | 8:10.19 | Evan Jager; USA | 8:13.22 | Chala Beyo; ETH | 8:15.85 | Nicholas Kiptonui Bett; KEN | 8:19.74 | Abraham Kibiwot; KEN | 8:23.60 | Hillary Bor; USA | 8:26.04 | Leonard Kipkemoi Bett; KEN | 8:27.18 |
| Men's Long Jump | Luvo Manyonga; RSA | 8.36 m | Ruswahl Samaai; RSA | 8.32 m | Henry Frayne; AUS | 8.16 m | Tajay Gayle; JAM | 8.15 m | Jeff Henderson; USA | 8.11 m | Marquis Dendy; USA | 8.09 m | Thobias Montler; SWE | 7.97 m | Changzhou Huang; CHN | 7.94 m |
| Men's Shot Put | Tom Walsh; NZL | 22.60 m | Darrell Hill; USA | 22.40 m | Ryan Crouser; USA | 22.18 m | Darlan Romani; BRA | 21.94 m | Tomáš Staněk; CZE | 21.87 m | David Storl; GER | 21.33 m | Michał Haratyk; POL | 21.23 m | Ryan Whiting; USA | 20.56 m |
| Men's Javelin Throw | Andreas Hofmann; GER | 91.44 m | Magnus Kirt; EST | 87.57 m | Thomas Röhler; GER | 85.76 m | Neeraj Chopra; IND | 85.73 m | Marcin Krukowski; POL | 85.32 m | Julian Weber; GER | 83.68 m | Jakub Vadlejch; CZE | 81.58 m | Gatis Čakšs; LAT | 78.13 m |
| Women's 100m (−0.5 m/s) | Murielle Ahouré-Demps; CIV | 11.01 | Dina Asher-Smith; GBR | 11.08 | Marie-Josée Ta Lou; CIV | 11.10 | Mujinga Kambundji; SUI | 11.14 | Dafne Schippers; NED | 11.15 | Michelle-Lee Ahye; TTO | 11.27 | Carina Horn; RSA | 11.54 | Blessing Okagbare; NGR | DQ |
| Women's 800m | Caster Semenya; RSA | 1:55.27 | Ajee Wilson; USA | 1:57.86 | Natoya Goule-Toppin; JAM | 1:58.49 | Habitam Alemu; ETH | 1:58.63 | Raevyn Rogers; USA | 1:59.05 | Francine Niyonsaba; BDI | 1:59.11 | Selina Rutz-Büchel; SUI | 2:00.64 | Rababe Arafi; MAR | 2:02.81 |
| Women's 5000m | Hellen Obiri; KEN | 14:38.39 | Sifan Hassan; NED | 14:38.77 | Senbere Teferi; ETH | 14:40.97 | Caroline Chepkoech Kipkirui; KEN | 14:43.96 | Agnes Jebet Tirop; KEN | 14:44.24 | Genzebe Dibaba; ETH | 14:50.24 | Letesenbet Gidey; ETH | 14:57.52 | Lilian Kasait Rengeruk; KEN | 15:03.11 |
| Women's 400mH | Dalilah Muhammad; USA | 53.88 | Shamier Little; USA | 54.21 | Janieve Russell; JAM | 54.38 | Georganne Moline; USA | 55.00 | Eilidh Doyle; GBR | 55.05 | Lea Sprunger; SUI | 55.36 | Sage Watson; CAN | 55.57 | Wenda Nel; RSA | 57.23 |
| Women's High Jump | Mariya Lasitskene; ANA | 1.97 m | Yuliia Levchenko; UKR | 1.94 m | Marie-Laurence Jungfleisch; GER | 1.90 m | Erika Kinsey; SWE | 1.90 m | Kateryna Tabashnyk; UKR | 1.85 m | Sofie Skoog; SWE | 1.85 m | Oksana Okuneva; UKR | 1.85 m | Levern Spencer; LCA | 1.85 m |
| Women's Pole Vault | Aikaterini Stefanidi; GRE | 4.87 m | Sandi Morris; USA | 4.82 m | Anzhelika Sidorova; ANA | 4.82 m | Holly Bradshaw; GBR | 4.57 m | Katie Moon; USA | 4.57 m | Nikoleta Kyriakopoulou; GRE | 4.57 m | Ninon Chapelle; FRA | 4.57 m | Angelica Moser; SUI | 4.42 m |
| Women's Triple Jump | Caterine Ibarguen; COL | 14.56 m | Shanieka Ricketts; JAM | 14.55 m | Kimberly Williams; JAM | 14.47 m | Tori Franklin; USA | 14.17 m | Rouguy Diallo; FRA | 14.15 m | Kristin Gierisch; GER | 14.06 m | Gabriela Petrova; BUL | 14.04 m | Ana Peleteiro; ESP | 13.76 m |
| Women's Javelin Throw | Tatsiana Khaladovich; BLR | 66.99 m | Liu Shiying; CHN | 66.00 m | Kara Winger; USA | 64.75 m | Huihui Lyu; CHN | 63.53 m | Nikola Ogrodníková; CZE | 62.99 m | Martina Ratej; SLO | 60.86 m | Sigrid Borge; NOR | 59.57 m | Géraldine Ruckstuhl; SUI | 56.07 m |

Brussels
| Event | 1st ⠀ | 2nd ⠀ | 3rd ⠀ | 4th ⠀ | 5th ⠀ | 6th ⠀ | 7th ⠀ | 8th ⠀ |
|---|---|---|---|---|---|---|---|---|
| Men's 100m (−0.3 m/s) | Christian Coleman; USA | 9.79 | Ronnie Baker; USA | 9.93 | Yohan Blake; JAM | 9.94 | Reece Prescod; GBR | 9.99 | Akani Simbine; RSA | 10.03 | Michael Rodgers; USA | 10.16 | Chijindu Ujah; GBR | 10.17 | Isiah Young; USA | 10.26 |
| Men's 800m | Emmanuel Kipkurui Korir; KEN | 1:44.72 | Marcin Lewandowski; POL | 1:45.21 | Ferguson Cheruiyot Rotich; KEN | 1:45.28 | Jake Wightman; GBR | 1:45.96 | Clayton Murphy; USA | 1:45.97 | Wyclife Kinyamal; KEN | 1:46.02 | Eliott Crestan; BEL | 1:47.59 | Antoine Gakeme; BDI | 1:50.74 |
| Men's 5000m | Selemon Barega; ETH | 12:43.02 | Hagos Gebrhiwet; ETH | 12:45.82 | Yomif Kejelcha; ETH | 12:46.79 | Muktar Edris; ETH | 12:55.18 | Abadi Hadis; ETH | 12:56.27 | Paul Chelimo; USA | 12:57.55 | Richard Yator; KEN | 12:59.44 | Getaneh Molla; ETH | 12:59.58 |
| Men's 110mH (−0.1 m/s) | Sergey Shubenkov; RUS | 12.97 | Orlando Ortega; ESP | 13.10 | Hansle Parchment; JAM | 13.35 | Pascal Martinot-Lagarde; FRA | 13.36 | Freddie Crittenden; USA | 13.39 | Devon Allen; USA | 13.41 | Ronald Levy; JAM | 13.47 | Balázs Baji; HUN | 13.63 |
| Men's High Jump | Brandon Starc; AUS | 2.33 m | Mateusz Przybylko; GER | 2.33 m | Gianmarco Tamberi; ITA | 2.31 m | Andrii Protsenko; UKR | 2.31 m | Donald Thomas; BAH | 2.29 m | Naoto Tobe; JPN | 2.26 m | Michael Mason; CAN | 2.26 m | Jeron Robinson; USA | 2.23 m |
| Men's Pole Vault | Timur Morgunov; ANA | 5.93 m | Sam Kendricks; USA | 5.88 m | Shawnacy Barber; CAN | 5.83 m | Piotr Lisek; POL | 5.78 m | Renaud Lavillenie; FRA | 5.73 m | Paweł Wojciechowski; POL | 5.68 m | Armand Duplantis; SWE | 5.68 m | Konstantinos Filippidis; GRE | 5.63 m |
| Men's Triple Jump | Pedro Pichardo; POR | 17.49 m | Christian Taylor; USA | 17.31 m | Donald Scott; USA | 17.25 m | Omar Craddock; USA | 16.95 m | Chris Benard; USA | 16.81 m | Max Heß; GER | 16.60 m | Alexis Copello; AZE | 16.20 m | Nelson Évora; POR | 15.86 m |
| Men's Discus Throw | Fedrick Dacres; JAM | 68.67 m | Andrius Gudžius; LTU | 67.56 m | Daniel Ståhl; SWE | 66.74 m | Mason Finley; USA | 66.09 m | Lukas Weißhaidinger; AUT | 65.66 m | Christoph Harting; GER | 65.13 m | Robert Urbanek; POL | 64.03 m | Ehsan Hadadi; IRI | 63.48 m |
| Women's 200m (+0.1 m/s) | Shaunae Miller-Uibo; BAH | 22.12 | Dafne Schippers; NED | 22.53 | Jamile Samuel; NED | 22.64 | Shericka Jackson; JAM | 22.72 | Jenna Prandini; USA | 22.96 | Gabrielle Thomas; USA | 23.18 | Ivet Lalova-Collio; BUL | 23.36 | Manon Depuydt; BEL | 23.69 |
| Women's 400m | Salwa Eid Naser; BRN | 49.33 | Phyllis Francis; USA | 50.51 | Shakima Wimbley; USA | 50.77 | Jaide Stepter Baynes; USA | 51.17 | Stephenie Ann McPherson; JAM | 51.40 | Jessica Beard; USA | 51.47 | Courtney Okolo; USA | 52.18 | Camille Laus; BEL | 53.72 |
| Women's 1500m | Laura Muir; GBR | 3:58.49 | Shelby Houlihan; USA | 3:58.94 | Sifan Hassan; NED | 3:59.41 | Gudaf Tsegay; ETH | 3:59.68 | Axumawit Embaye; ETH | 4:02.75 | Winny Chebet; KEN | 4:03.37 | Sofia Ennaoui; POL | 4:03.49 | Rababe Arafi; MAR | 4:03.82 |
| Women's 100mH (+0.1 m/s) | Brianna McNeal; USA | 12.61 | Kendra Harrison; USA | 12.63 | Danielle Williams; JAM | 12.64 | Tobi Amusan; NGR | 12.69 | Sharika Nelvis; USA | 12.80 | Nadine Visser; NED | 12.81 | Eline Berings; BEL | 12.94 | Dawn Harper-Nelson; USA | 13.08 |
| Women's 3000mSC | Beatrice Chepkoech; KEN | 8:55.10 | Norah Jeruto; KEN | 8:59.62 | Hyvin Kiyeng; KEN | 9:01.60 | Emma Coburn; USA | 9:06.51 | Celliphine Chepteek Chespol; KEN | 9:06.75 | Courtney Frerichs; USA | 9:07.07 | Peruth Chemutai; UGA | 9:13.58 | Aisha Praught-Leer; JAM | 9:14.09 |
| Women's Long Jump | Caterine Ibarguen; COL | 6.80 m | Shara Proctor; GBR | 6.70 m | Sha'keela Saunders; USA | 6.68 m | Malaika Mihambo; GER | 6.61 m | Brooke Buschkuehl; AUS | 6.57 m | Lorraine Ugen; GBR | 6.53 m | Christabel Nettey; CAN | 6.52 m | Hanne Maudens; BEL | 6.36 m |
| Women's Shot Put | Lijiao Gong; CHN | 19.83 m | Raven Saunders; USA | 19.64 m | Christina Schwanitz; GER | 19.50 m | Aliona Dubitskaya; BLR | 19.01 m | Paulina Guba; POL | 18.54 m | Danniel Thomas-Dodd; JAM | 18.27 m | Melissa Boekelman; NED | 17.90 m | Yuliya Leantsiuk; BLR | 16.13 m |
| Women's Discus Throw | Yaimé Pérez; CUB | 65.00 m | Andressa de Morais; BRA | 64.65 m | Sandra Perković; CRO | 64.31 m | Claudine Vita; GER | 61.33 m | Gia Lewis-Smallwood; USA | 59.28 m | Whitney Ashley; USA | 58.75 m | Nadine Müller; GER | 58.24 m | Denia Caballero; CUB | 56.37 m |

== 2018 IAAF Diamond League Final ==
=== Men ===
100 m Men
| Rank | Lane | Name | Nationality | Time | Reaction Time | Notes |
|---|---|---|---|---|---|---|
| 1st place, gold medalist(s) | 6 | Christian Coleman | United States | 9.79 | 0.165 | PB WL |
| 2nd place, silver medalist(s) | 4 | Ronnie Baker | United States | 9.93 | 0.251 | |
| 3rd place, bronze medalist(s) | 7 | Yohan Blake | Jamaica | 9.94 | 0.174 | SB |
| 4 | 5 | Reece Prescod | (United Kingdom) Great Britain | 9.99 | 0.155 | |
| 5 | 3 | Akani Simbine | South Africa | 10.03 | 0.121 | |
| 6 | 2 | Michael Rodgers | United States | 10.16 | 0.168 | |
| 7 | 1 | Chijindu Ujah | (United Kingdom) Great Britain | 10.17 | 0.179 | |
| 8 | 8 | Isiah Young | United States | 10.26 | 0.199 | |
200 m Men
| 1st place, gold medalist(s) | 6 | Noah Lyles | United States | 19.67 | 0.145 | |
| 2nd place, silver medalist(s) | 5 | Ramil Guliyev | Turkey | 19.98 | 0.154 | |
| 3rd place, bronze medalist(s) | 8 | Jereem Richards | Trinidad and Tobago | 20.04 | 0.116 | |
| 4 | 4 | Aaron Brown | Canada | 20.14 | 0.135 | |
| 5 | 2 | Álex Quiñónez | Ecuador | 20.34 | 0.203 | |
| 6 | 7 | Alex Wilson | Switzerland | 20.40 | 0.109 | |
| 7 | 1 | Luxolo Adams | South Africa | 20.51 | 0.152 | |
| 8 | 3 | Nethaneel Mitchell-Blake | Great Britain | 20.53 | 0.146 | |
400 m Men
| 1st place, gold medalist(s) | 5 | Fred Kerley | United States | 44.80 | 0.140 | |
| 2nd place, silver medalist(s) | 3 | Nathan Strother | United States | 44.93 | 0.156 | |
| 3rd place, bronze medalist(s) | 6 | Matthew Hudson-Smith | Great Britain | 44.95 | 0.139 | |
| 4 | 7 | Paul Dedewo | United States | 45.18 | 0.157 | |
| 5 | 2 | Baboloki Thebe | Botswana | 45.41 | 0.149 | |
| 6 | 8 | Luguelín Santos | Dominican Republic | 46.17 | 0.221 | |
| 7 | 1 | Pieter Conradie | South Africa | 47.37 | 0.137 | |
| 8 | 4 | Steven Gardiner | Bahamas | DNF | 0.126 | |
110 m hurdles Men
| 1st place, gold medalist(s) | 5 | Sergey Shubenkov | Authorised Neutral Athletes | 12.97 | 0.168 | |
| 2nd place, silver medalist(s) | 6 | Orlando Ortega | Spain | 13.10 | 0.124 | |
| 3rd place, bronze medalist(s) | 7 | Hansle Parchment | Jamaica | 13.35 | 0.152 | |
| 4 | 3 | Pascal Martinot-Lagarde | France | 13.36 | 0.153 | |
| 5 | 8 | Freddie Crittenden | United States | 13.39 | 0.151 | |
| 6 | 2 | Devon Allen | United States | 13.41 | 0.126 | |
| 7 | 4 | Ronald Levy | Jamaica | 13.47 | 0.148 | |
| 8 | 1 | Balázs Baji | Hungary | 13.63 | 0.140 | |
400 m hurdles Men
| 1st place, gold medalist(s) | 3 | Kyron McMaster | British Virgin Islands | 48.08 | 0.178 | |
| 2nd place, silver medalist(s) | 5 | Karsten Warholm | Norway | 48.10 | 0.135 | |
| 3rd place, bronze medalist(s) | 4 | Yasmani Copello | Turkey | 48.73 | 0.158 | |
| 4 | 7 | Rasmus Mägi | Estonia | 49.28 | 0.176 | |
| 5 | 8 | Cornel Fredericks | South Africa | 49.96 | 0.144 | |
| 6 | 1 | José Reynaldo Bencosme de Leon | Italy | 50.01 | 0.151 | |
| 7 | 2 | Bershawn Jackson | United States | 50.63 | 0.140 | |
| 8 | 6 | TJ Holmes | United States | 51.39 | 0.186 | |
800 m Men
| 1st place, gold medalist(s) | 6 | Emmanuel Kipkurui Korir | Kenya | 1:44.72 | | |
| 2nd place, silver medalist(s) | 5-2 | Marcin Lewandowski | Poland | 1:45.21 | | |
| 3rd place, bronze medalist(s) | 7 | Ferguson Cheruiyot Rotich | Kenya | 1:45.28 | | |
| 4 | 9 | Jake Wightman | (United Kingdom) Great Britain | 1:45.96 | | |
| 5 | 8 | Clayton Murphy | United States | 1:45.97 | | |
| 6 | 3 | Wycliffe Kinyamal | Kenya | 1:46.02 | | |
| 7 | 1 | Eliott Crestan | Belgium | 1:47.59 | | |
| 8 | 2 | Antoine Gakeme | Burundi | 1:50.74 | | |
| 9 | 4 | Jonathan Kitilit | Kenya | DNF | | |
1500 m Men
| 1st place, gold medalist(s) | 11 | Timothy Cheruiyot | Kenya | 3:30.27 | | |
| 2nd place, silver medalist(s) | 12 | Elijah Motonei Manangoi | Kenya | 3:31.16 | | |
| 3rd place, bronze medalist(s) | 10 | Ayanleh Souleiman | Djibouti | 3:31.24 | | |
| 4 | 5 | Abdalaati Iguider | Morocco | 3:31.59 | | |
| 5 | 7 | Brahim Kaazouzi | Morocco | 3:33.82 | | |
| 6 | 6 | Aman Wote | Ethiopia | 3:34.05 | | |
| 7 | 9 | Filip Ingebrigtsen | Norway | 3:34.13 | | |
| 8 | 8 | Samuel Tefera | Ethiopia | 3:37.49 | | |
| 9 | 1 | Bethwell Birgen | Kenya | 3:38.76 | | |
| 10 | 3 | Ryan Gregson | Australia | 3:39.04 | | |
| 11 | 4 | Charlie Grice | (United Kingdom) Great Britain | 3:40.06 | | |
| 12 | 2 | Taresa Tolosa | Ethiopia | 3:45.45 | | |
3000 m steeplechase Men
| 1st place, gold medalist(s) | 12 | Conseslus Kipruto | Kenya | 8:10.15 | | |
| 2nd place, silver medalist(s) | 11 | Soufiane El Bakkali | Morocco | 8:10.19 | | |
| 3rd place, bronze medalist(s) | 10 | Evan Jager | United States | 8:13.22 | | |
| 4 | 8 | Chala Beyo | Ethiopia | 8:15.85 | | |
| 5 | 4 | Nicholas Bett | Kenya | 8:19.74 | | |
| 6 | 7 | Abraham Kibiwot | Kenya | 8:23.60 | | |
| 7 | 6 | Hillary Bor | United States | 8:26.04 | | |
| 8 | 2 | Leonard Kipkemoi Bett | Kenya | 8:27.18 | | |
| 9 | 9 | Benjamin Kigen | Kenya | 8:27.33 | | |
| 10 | 1 | Kennedy Njiru | Kenya | 8:28.68 | | |
| 11 | 3 | Matthew Hughes | Canada | 8:36.69 | | |
| 12 | 5 | Amos Kirui | Kenya | 8:38.96 | | |
5000 m Men
| 1st place, gold medalist(s) | 13-1 | Selemon Barega | Ethiopia | 12:43.02 | | WU20R WL DLR |
| 2nd place, silver medalist(s) | 3-1 | Hagos Gebrhiwet | Ethiopia | 12:45.82 | | PB |
| 3rd place, bronze medalist(s) | 11-1 | Yomif Kejelcha | Ethiopia | 12:46.79 | | PB |
| 4 | 8-1 | Muktar Edris | Ethiopia | 12:55.18 | | SB |
| 5 | 7-1 | Abadi Hadis | Ethiopia | 12:56.27 | | PB |
| 6 | 12-1 | Paul Chelimo | United States | 12:57.55 | | PB |
| 7 | 5-1 | Richard Yator | Kenya | 12:59.44 | | PB |
| 8 | 1-1 | Getaneh Molla | Ethiopia | 12:59.58 | | PB |
| 9 | 2-1 | Mohammed Ahmed | Canada | 13:03.08 | | SB |
| 10 | 4-1 | Ben True | United States | 13:04.11 | | SB |
| 11 | 9-1 | Bashir Abdi | Belgium | 13:04.91 | | PB |
| 12 | 10-1 | Stewart McSweyn | Australia | 13:05.23 | | PB |
| 13 | 6-1 | Cyrus Rutto | Kenya | 13:28.25 | | |
| 14 | 16-1 | Tamás Kazi | Hungary | DNF | | |
| 15 | 15-1 | Vincent Letting | Kenya | DNF | | |
| 16 | 14-1 | Stanley Waithaka Mburu | Kenya | DNF | | |
Pole Vault Men
| 1st place, gold medalist(s) | 9 | Timur Morgunov | Authorised Neutral Athletes | 5.93 m (19 ft 5 in) | | |
| 2nd place, silver medalist(s) | 11 | Sam Kendricks | United States | 5.88 m (19 ft 3 in) | | |
| 3rd place, bronze medalist(s) | 8 | Shawnacy Barber | Canada | 5.83 m (19 ft 2 in) | | |
| 4 | 7 | Piotr Lisek | Poland | 5.78 m (19 ft 0 in) | | |
| 5 | 10 | Renaud Lavillenie | France | 5.73 m (18 ft 10 in) | | |
| 6 | 5 | Paweł Wojciechowski | Poland | 5.68 m (18 ft 8 in) | | |
| 7 | 12 | Armand Duplantis | Sweden | 5.68 m (18 ft 8 in) | | |
| 8 | 2 | Konstantinos Filippidis | Greece | 5.63 m (18 ft 6 in) | | |
High Jump Men
| 1st place, gold medalist(s) | | Brandon Starc | Australia | 2.33 m (7 ft 8 in) | | |
| 2nd place, silver medalist(s) | | Mateusz Przybylko | (Germany) | 2.33 m (7 ft 8 in) | | |
| 3rd place, bronze medalist(s) | | Gianmarco Tamberi | Italy | 2.31 m (7 ft 7 in) | | |
| 4 | | Andriy Protsenko | Ukraine | 2.31 m (7 ft 7 in) | | SB |
| 5 | | Donald Thomas | (The Bahamas) Bahamas | 2.29 m (7 ft 6 in) | | |
| 6 | | Naoto Tobe | (Japan) | 2.26 m (7 ft 5 in) | | |
| 7 | | Michael Mason | Canada | 2.26 m (7 ft 5 in) | | |
| 8 | | Bryan McBride | United States | 2.23 m (7 ft 4 in) | | |
| 8 | | Jeron Robinson | United States | 2.23 m (7 ft 4 in) | | |
| 8 | | Mathew Sawe | Kenya | 2.23 m (7 ft 4 in) | | |
| 11 | | Bram Ghuys | Belgium | 2.20 m (7 ft 3 in) | | |
| 12 | | Marco Fassinotti | Italy | NH | | |
Long Jump Men
| 1st place, gold medalist(s) | | Luvo Manyonga | South Africa | 8.36 m (27 ft 5 in) | | |
| 2nd place, silver medalist(s) | | Ruswahl Samaai | South Africa | 8.32 m (27 ft 4 in) | | |
| 3rd place, bronze medalist(s) | | Henry Frayne | Australia | 8.16 m (26 ft 9 in) | | |
| 4 | | Tajay Gayle | Jamaica | 8.15 m (26 ft 9 in) | | |
| 5 | | Jeff Henderson | United States | 8.11 m (26 ft 7 in) | | |
| 6 | | Marquis Dendy | United States | 8.09 m (26 ft 7 in) | | |
| 7 | | Thobias Nilsson Montler | Sweden | 7.97 m (26 ft 2 in) | | |
| 8 | | Changzhou Huang | (China) | 7.94 m (26 ft 1 in) | | |
| 9 | | Benjamin Gföhler | Switzerland | 7.70 m (25 ft 3 in) | | |
Triple Jump Men
| 1st place, gold medalist(s) | | Pedro Pablo Pichardo | Portugal | 17.49 m (57 ft 5 in) | | |
| 2nd place, silver medalist(s) | | Christian Taylor | United States | 17.31 m (56 ft 9 in) | | |
| 3rd place, bronze medalist(s) | | Donald Scott | United States | 17.25 m (56 ft 7 in) | | |
| 4 | | Omar Craddock | United States | 16.95 m (55 ft 7 in) | | |
| 5 | | Chris Benard | United States | 16.81 m (55 ft 2 in) | | |
| 6 | | Max Heß | (Germany) | 16.60 m (54 ft 6 in) | | |
| 7 | | Alexis Copello | Azerbaijan | 16.20 m (53 ft 2 in) | | |
| 8 | | Nelson Évora | Portugal | 15.86 m (52 ft 0 in) | | |
Shot Put Men
| 1st place, gold medalist(s) | | Tomas Walsh | New Zealand | 22.60 m (74 ft 2 in) | | |
| 2nd place, silver medalist(s) | | Darrell Hill | United States | 22.40 m (73 ft 6 in) | | |
| 3rd place, bronze medalist(s) | | Ryan Crouser | United States | 22.18 m (72 ft 9 in) | | |
| 4 | | Darlan Romani | Brazil | 21.94 m (72 ft 0 in) | | |
| 5 | | Tomáš Stanek | Czech Republic | 21.87 m (71 ft 9 in) | | |
| 6 | | David Storl | (Germany) | 21.33 m (70 ft 0 in) | | |
| 7 | | Michał Haratyk | Poland | 21.23 m (69 ft 8 in) | | |
| 8 | | Ryan Whiting | United States | 20.56 m (67 ft 5 in) | | |
Discus Men
| 1st place, gold medalist(s) | | Fedrick Dacres | Jamaica | 68.67 m (225 ft 4 in) | | |
| 2nd place, silver medalist(s) | | Andrius Gudžius | Lithuania | 67.56 m (221 ft 8 in) | | |
| 3rd place, bronze medalist(s) | | Daniel Ståhl | Sweden | 66.74 m (219 ft 0 in) | | |
| 4 | | Mason Finley | United States | 66.09 m (216 ft 10 in) | | |
| 5 | | Lukas Weisshaidinger | Austria | 65.66 m (215 ft 5 in) | | |
| 6 | | Christoph Harting | Germany | 65.13 m (213 ft 8 in) | | |
| 7 | | Robert Urbanek | Poland | 64.03 m (210 ft 1 in) | | |
| 8 | | Ehsan Haddadi | Iran | 63.48 m (208 ft 3 in) | | |
Javelin Men
| 1st place, gold medalist(s) | | Andreas Hofmann | Germany | 91.44 m (300 ft 0 in) | | |
| 2nd place, silver medalist(s) | | Magnus Kirt | Estonia | 87.57 m (287 ft 4 in) | | |
| 3rd place, bronze medalist(s) | | Thomas Röhler | Germany | 85.76 m (281 ft 4 in) | | |
| 4 | | Neeraj Chopra | India | 85.73 m (281 ft 3 in) | | |
| 5 | | Marcin Krukowski | Poland | 85.32 m (279 ft 11 in) | | SB |
| 6 | | Julian Weber | Germany | 83.68 m (274 ft 6 in) | | |
| 7 | | Jakub Vadlejch | Czech Republic | 81.58 m (267 ft 8 in) | | |
| 8 | | Gatis Čakšs | Latvia | 78.13 m (256 ft 4 in) | | |

=== Women ===
100 m Women
| Rank | Lane | Name | Nationality | Time | Reaction Time | Notes |
|---|---|---|---|---|---|---|
| 1st place, gold medalist(s) | 3 | Murielle Ahouré | Ivory Coast | 11.01 | 0.123 | |
| 2nd place, silver medalist(s) | 4 | Dina Asher-Smith | (United Kingdom) Great Britain | 11.08 | 0.133 | |
| 3rd place, bronze medalist(s) | 5 | Marie-Josée Ta Lou | Ivory Coast | 11.10 | 0.135 | |
| 4 | 2 | Mujinga Kambundji | Switzerland | 11.14 | 0.138 | |
| 5 | 6 | Dafne Schippers | Netherlands | 11.15 | 0.144 | |
| 6 | 7 | Michelle-Lee Ahye | Trinidad and Tobago | 11.27 | 0.127 | |
| 7 | 8 | Carina Horn | South Africa | 11.54 | 0.162 | |
| 8 | 1 | Blessing Okagbare-Ighoteguonor | Nigeria | DQ | | |
200 m Women
| 1st place, gold medalist(s) | 6 | Shaunae Miller-Uibo | Bahamas | 22.12 | 0.141 | |
| 2nd place, silver medalist(s) | 5 | Dafne Schippers | Netherlands | 22.53 | 0.191 | |
| 3rd place, bronze medalist(s) | 8 | Jamile Samuel | Netherlands | 22.64 | 0.153 | |
| 4 | 4 | Shericka Jackson | Jamaica | 22.72 | 0.170 | |
| 5 | 7 | Jenna Prandini | United States | 22.96 | 0.153 | |
| 6 | 3 | Gabrielle Thomas | United States | 23.18 | 0.186 | |
| 7 | 2 | Ivet Lalova-Collio | Bulgaria | 23.36 | 0.153 | |
| 8 | 1 | Cynthia Bolingo | Belgium | 23.82 | 0.184 | |
400 m Women
| 1st place, gold medalist(s) | 4 | Salwa Eid Naser | Bahrain | 49.33 | 0.151 | |
| 2nd place, silver medalist(s) | 6 | Francis Phyllis | United States | 50.51 | 0.208 | |
| 3rd place, bronze medalist(s) | 5 | Wimbley Shakima | United States | 50.77 | 0.140 | |
| 4 | 8 | Stepter Jaide | United States | 51.17 | 0.146 | |
| 5 | 7 | McPherson Stephenie Ann | Jamaica | 51.40 | 0.139 | |
| 6 | 3 | Beard Jessica | United States | 51.47 | 0.220 | |
| 7 | 2 | Okolo Courtney | United States | 52.18 | 0.238 | |
| 8 | 9 | Laus Camille | Belgium | 53.72 | 0.214 | |
100 m hurdles Women
| 1st place, gold medalist(s) | 6 | Brianna Rollins-McNeal | United States | 12.61 | 0.196 | |
| 2nd place, silver medalist(s) | 4 | Kendra Harrison | United States | 12.63 | 0.205 | |
| 3rd place, bronze medalist(s) | 5 | Danielle Williams | Jamaica | 12.64 | 0.143 | |
| 4 | 2 | Tobi Amusan | Nigeria | 12.69 | 0.134 | |
| 5 | 3 | Sharika Nelvis | United States | 12.80 | 0.142 | |
| 6 | 8 | Nadine Visser | Netherlands | 12.81 | 0.151 | |
| 7 | 9 | Eline Berings | Belgium | 12.94 | 0.107 | |
| 8 | 1 | Dawn Harper-Nelson | United States | 13.08 | 0.154 | |
| 9 | 7 | Christina Manning | United States | 13.34 | 0.118 | |
400 m hurdles Women
| 1st place, gold medalist(s) | 5 | Dalilah Muhammad | United States | 53.88 | 0.184 | |
| 2nd place, silver medalist(s) | 3 | Shamier Little | United States | 54.21 | 0.213 | |
| 3rd place, bronze medalist(s) | 6 | Janieve Russell | Jamaica | 54.38 | 0.153 | |
| 4 | 2 | Georganne Moline | United States | 55.00 | 0.261 | |
| 5 | 7 | Eilidh Doyle | (United Kingdom) Great Britain | 55.05 | 0.176 | |
| 6 | 4 | Léa Sprunger | Switzerland | 55.36 | 0.174 | |
| 7 | 8 | Sage Watson | Canada | 55.57 | 0.184 | |
| 8 | 1 | Wenda Nel | South Africa | 57.23 | 0.226 | |
800 m Women
| 1st place, gold medalist(s) | 7 | Caster Semenya | South Africa | 1:55.27 | | |
| 2nd place, silver medalist(s) | 8 | Ajeé Wilson | United States | 1:57.86 | | |
| 3rd place, bronze medalist(s) | 5 | Natoya Goule | Jamaica | 1:58.49 | | |
| 4 | 3 | Habitam Alemu | Ethiopia | 1:58.63 | | |
| 5 | 4-2 | Raevyn Rogers | United States | 1:59.05 | | |
| 6 | 6 | Francine Niyonsaba | Burundi | 1:59.11 | | |
| 7 | 1 | Selina Büchel | Switzerland | 2:00.64 | | |
| 8 | 2 | Rababe Arafi | Morocco | 2:02.81 | | |
| 9 | 4-1 | Charlene Lipsey | United States | 2:04.77 | | |
1500 m Women
| 1st place, gold medalist(s) | 12-1 | Laura Muir | (United Kingdom) Great Britain | 3:58.49 | | |
| 2nd place, silver medalist(s) | 9-1 | Shelby Houlihan | United States | 3:58.94 | | |
| 3rd place, bronze medalist(s) | 10-1 | Sifan Hassan | Netherlands | 3:59.41 | | |
| 4 | 13-1 | Gudaf Tsegay | Ethiopia | 3:59.68 | | |
| 5 | 3-1 | Axumawit Embaye | Ethiopia | 4:02.75 | | |
| 6 | 7-1 | Winny Chebet | Kenya | 4:03.37 | | |
| 7 | 2-1 | Sofia Ennaoui | Poland | 4:03.49 | | |
| 8 | 8-1 | Rababe Arafi | Morocco | 4:03.82 | | |
| 9 | 4-1 | Laura Weightman | (United Kingdom) Great Britain | 4:04.36 | | |
| 10 | 6-1 | Jenny Simpson | United States | 4:04.57 | | |
| 11 | 1-1 | Elise Vanderelst | Belgium | 4:05.57 | | |
| 12 | 11-1 | Nelly Jepkosgei | Kenya | 4:10.13 | | |
| 13 | 5-1 | Habitam Alemu | Ethiopia | 4:11.33 | | |
| | 14-1 | Daryia Barysevich | Belarus | DNF | | |
3000 m steeplechase Women
| 1st place, gold medalist(s) | 12-1 | Chepkoech Beatrice | Kenya | 8:55.10 | | MR |
| 2nd place, silver medalist(s) | 8-1 | Jeruto Norah | Kenya | 8:59.62 | | PB |
| 3rd place, bronze medalist(s) | 11-1 | Kiyeng Hyvin | Kenya | 9:01.60 | | SB |
| 4 | 9-1 | Coburn Emma | United States | 9:06.51 | | |
| 5 | 10-1 | Chespol Celliphine Chepteek | Kenya | 9:06.75 | | |
| 6 | 7-1 | Frerichs Courtney | United States | 9:07.07 | | |
| 7 | 6-1 | Chemutai Peruth | Uganda | 9:13.58 | | |
| 8 | 1-1 | Praught Aisha | Jamaica | 9:14.09 | | NR PB |
| 9 | 5-1 | Yavi Winifred Mutaile | BRN | 9:14.52 | | |
| 10 | 2-1 | Jepkemei Daisy | Kenya | 9:17.08 | | |
| 11 | 3-1 | Chepngetich Rosaline | Kenya | 9:28.94 | | |
| 12 | 4-1 | Grovdal Karoline Bjerkeli | Norway | 9:38.34 | | |
| | 13-1 | Fancy Cherono | Kenya | DNF | | |
| | 14-1 | Caroline Tuigong | Kenya | DNF | | |
5000 m Women
| 1st place, gold medalist(s) | 13 | Hellen Obiri | Kenya | 14:38.39 | | |
| 2nd place, silver medalist(s) | 12 | Sifan Hassan | Netherlands | 14:38.77 | | |
| 3rd place, bronze medalist(s) | 9 | Senbere Teferi | Ethiopia | 14:40.97 | | |
| 4 | 3 | Caroline Chepkoech Kipkirui | Kenya | 14:43.96 | | SB |
| 5 | 8 | Agnes Jebet Tiprop | Kenya | 14:44.24 | | |
| 6 | 11 | Genzebe Dibaba | Ethiopia | 14:50.24 | | |
| 7 | 10 | Letesenbet Gidey | Ethiopia | 14:57.52 | | |
| 8 | 6 | Lilian Kasait Rengeruk | Kenya | 15:03.11 | | |
| 9 | 5 | Konstanze Klosterhalfen | Germany | 15:04.16 | | |
| 10 | 4 | Meraf Bahta | Sweden | 15:08.17 | | SB |
| 11 | 7 | Eilish Mccolgan | (United Kingdom) Great Britain | 15:09.00 | | |
| 12 | 1 | Meskerem Mamo | Ethiopia | 15:20.56 | | |
| 13 | 2 | Melissa Courtney | (United Kingdom) Great Britain | 15:24.58 | | |
| | 15 | Eva Cherono | Kenya | DNF | | |
| | 14 | Gloriah Kite | Kenya | DNF | | |
| | 16 | Renata Pliś | Poland | DNF | | |
Pole Vault Women
| 1st place, gold medalist(s) | 12 | Katerina Stefanidi | Greece | 4.87 m (16 ft 0 in) | | SB |
| 2nd place, silver medalist(s) | 11 | Sandi Morris | United States | 4.82 m (15 ft 10 in) | | |
| 3rd place, bronze medalist(s) | 10 | Anzhelika Sidorova | Authorised Neutral Athletes | 4.82 metres (15 ft 10 in) | | |
| 4 | 7 | Holly Bradshaw | (United Kingdom) Great Britain | 4.57 metres (15 ft 0 in) | | |
| 4 | 9 | Katie Nageotte | United States | 4.57 metres (15 ft 0 in) | | |
| 6 | 8 | Nikoleta Kyriakopoulou | Greece | 4.57 metres (15 ft 0 in) | | |
| 7 | 6 | Ninon Guillon-Romarin | France | 4.57 metres (15 ft 0 in) | | |
| 8 | 2 | Angelica Moser | Switzerland | 4.42 metres (14 ft 6 in) | | SB |
| 9 | 4 | Robeilys Peinado | Venezuela | 4.27 metres (14 ft 0 in) | | |
| | 5 | Angelica Bengtsson | Sweden | NM | | |
| | 3 | Olga Mullina | Authorised Neutral Athletes | NM | | |
| | 1 | Lene Onsrud Retzius | Norway | NM | | |
High Jump Women
| 1st place, gold medalist(s) | | Mariya Lasitskene | ANA | 1.97 m (6 ft 6 in) | | |
| 2nd place, silver medalist(s) | | Yuliya Levchenko | Ukraine | 1.94 m (6 ft 4 in) | | |
| 3rd place, bronze medalist(s) | | Marie-Laurence Jungfleisch | Germany | 1.90 m (6 ft 3 in) | | |
| 4 | | Erika Kinsey | Sweden | 1.90 m (6 ft 3 in) | | |
| 5 | | Oksana Okunyeva | Ukraine | 1.85 m (6 ft 1 in) | | |
| 5 | | Levern Spencer | Saint Lucia | 1.85 m (6 ft 1 in) | | |
| 5 | | Kateryna Tabashnyk | Ukraine | 1.85 m (6 ft 1 in) | | |
| 5 | | Elena Vallortigara | Italy | 1.85 m (6 ft 1 in) | | |
| 5 | | Sofie Skoog | Sweden | 1.85 m (6 ft 1 in) | | |
| 10 | | Alessia Trost | Italy | 1.85 m (6 ft 1 in) | | |
| 11 | | Morgan Lake | (United Kingdom) Great Britain | 1.85 m (6 ft 1 in) | | |
| DNS | | Mirela Demireva | Bulgaria | | | |
Triple Jump Women
| 1st place, gold medalist(s) | | Caterine Ibargüen | Colombia | 14.56 m (47 ft 9 in) | | |
| 2nd place, silver medalist(s) | | Shanieka Ricketts | Jamaica | 14.55 m (47 ft 9 in) | | |
| 3rd place, bronze medalist(s) | | Kimberly Williams | Jamaica | 14.47 m (47 ft 6 in) | | |
| 4 | | Tori Franklin | United States | 14.17 m (46 ft 6 in) | | |
| 5 | | Rouguy Diallo | France | 14.15 m (46 ft 5 in) | | |
| 6 | | Kristin Gierisch | Germany | 14.06 m (46 ft 2 in) | | |
| 7 | | Gabriela Petrova | Bulgaria | 14.04 m (46 ft 1 in) | | |
| 8 | | Ana Peleteiro | Spain | 13.76 m (45 ft 2 in) | | |
Long Jump Women
| 1st place, gold medalist(s) | | | | | | |
| 2nd place, silver medalist(s) | | | | | | |
| 3rd place, bronze medalist(s) | | | | | | |
| 4 | | | | | | |
| 5 | | | | | | |
| 6 | | | | | | |
| 7 | | | | | | |
| 8 | | | | | | |
Shot Put Women
| 1st place, gold medalist(s) | | | | | | |
| 2nd place, silver medalist(s) | | | | | | |
| 3rd place, bronze medalist(s) | | | | | | |
| 4 | | | | | | |
| 5 | | | | | | |
| 6 | | | | | | |
| 7 | | | | | | |
| 8 | | | | | | |
Discus Women
| 1st place, gold medalist(s) | | | | | | |
| 2nd place, silver medalist(s) | | | | | | |
| 3rd place, bronze medalist(s) | | | | | | |
| 4 | | | | | | |
| 5 | | | | | | |
| 6 | | | | | | |
| 7 | | | | | | |
| 8 | | | | | | |
Javelin Women
| 1st place, gold medalist(s) | | | | | | |
| 2nd place, silver medalist(s) | | | | | | |
| 3rd place, bronze medalist(s) | | | | | | |
| 4 | | | | | | |
| 5 | | | | | | |
| 6 | | | | | | |
| 7 | | | | | | |
| 8 | | | | | | |
