= 2013 World Youth Championships in Athletics – Boys' 2000 metres steeplechase =

Boys' 2000 metres steeplechase at the 2013 World Youth Championships in Athletics
- Venue: RSC Olimpiyskiy
- Dates: 10 July (heats); 12 July (final)
- Competitors: 43
- Winning time: 5:19.99 WYB

Medalists
gold medal	Meresa Kahsay	Ethiopia
silver medal	Nicholas Kiptanui Bett	Kenya
bronze medal	Justus Lagat	Kenya

The boys' 2000 metres steeplechase at the 2013 World Youth Championships in Athletics was held on 10 and 12 July.

== Medalists ==
Gold	Silver	Bronze
Meresa Kahsay; Ethiopia	Nicholas Kiptanui Bett; Kenya	Justus Lagat; Kenya

== Records ==
Prior to the competition, the following records were as follows.

World Youth Best	Nabil Ouhaddi (MAR)	5:21.36	Rabat, Morocco	16 July 2006
Championship Record	Abel Mutai (KEN)	5:24.69	Marrakesh, Morocco	15 July 2005
World Youth Leading	Nicholas Kiptanui Bett (KEN)	5:29.2	Nairobi, Kenya	11 June 2013

== Heats ==
Qualification rule: first 3 of each heat (Q) plus the 6 fastest times (q) qualified.

=== Heat 1 ===
Rank	Name	Nationality	Time	Notes
1	Meresa Kahsay	Ethiopia	5:45.10	Q
2	Hiroshi Yanokura	Japan	5:53.85	Q
3	Patrick Karl	Germany	5:55.54	Q
4	Mateusz Kaczmarek	Poland	5:56.46	q
5	Haran Dunderdale	Great Britain	5:56.78	q
6	Ben Preisner	Canada	5:57.60	
7	Ömer Tuncer	Turkey	6:03.96	PB
8	Michal Talán	Slovakia	6:07.03	PB
9	Luca Sinn	Austria	6:07.87	
10	Bohdan Shkilnyuk	Ukraine	6:12.22	
11	Samuel Abascal	Spain	6:13.83	
12	Dávid Major	Hungary	6:14.01	
13	Danny Guamán	Ecuador	6:14.54	
	Salama Modihi	Egypt	DNS	

=== Heat 2 ===
Rank	Name	Nationality	Time	Notes
1	Nicholas Kiptanui Bett	Kenya	5:44.69	Q
2	Hicham Chemlal	Morocco	5:45.84	Q, PB
3	Soufien Cherni	Tunisia	5:50.82	Q, PB
4	Tobias Wolter	Canada	5:51.03	q, PB
5	Mohamed Elnazir Ramadan	Qatar	5:55.83	q, PB
6	Andreas Jansson	Sweden	5:56.04	q
7	Ruan Meintjies	South Africa	6:03.49	
8	Patryk Blaszczyk	Poland	6:04.97	
9	Francisco Reyes	Mexico	6:08.74	
10	Giulio Perpetuo	Italy	6:13.87	
11	Serhiy Shevchenko	Ukraine	6:14.33	
12	Julián Sánchez-Pinto	Spain	6:15.22	
13	Rareș Popescu	Romania	6:15.83	
14	Bandula Withanage	Sri Lanka	6:29.32	
	Nabil El-Hannachi	Algeria	DQ	

=== Heat 3 ===
Rank	Name	Nationality	Time	Notes
1	Justus Lagat	Kenya	5:35.22	Q, PB
2	Micheale Atsbaha	Ethiopia	5:39.97	Q
3	Filip Sasínek	Czech Republic	5:45.03	Q, PB
4	Bailey Roth	United States	5:45.20	q, PB
5	Konstadinos Migas	Greece	5:58.30	
6	Said Ettaqy	Italy	6:01.49	
7	Weverton Fidelis	Brazil	6:01.58	
8	Daniel Reyes	Mexico	6:03.11	PB
9	Jonnathan Mogroviejo	Ecuador	6:04.32	
10	Matthew Axe	Great Britain	6:05.28	
11	Islam Amangos	Kazakhstan	6:13.15	
12	Luis de la Cruz	Peru	6:32.10	
13	Darius Cristea	Romania	6:33.22	
14	Hansajith Mudiyanselage	Sri Lanka	6:38.63	

== Final ==
Rank	Name	Nationality	Time	Notes
1st place, gold medalist(s)	Meresa Kahsay	Ethiopia	5:19.99	WYB
2nd place, silver medalist(s)	Nicholas Kiptanui Bett	Kenya	5:20.92	PB
3rd place, bronze medalist(s)	Justus Lagat	Kenya	5:30.00	PB
4	Hicham Chemlal	Morocco	5:32.92	PB
5	Micheale Atsbaha	Ethiopia	5:36.64	PB
6	Hiroshi Yanokura	Japan	5:42.16	PB
7	Bailey Roth	United States	5:45.87	
8	Filip Sasínek	Czech Republic	5:47.90	
9	Mohamed Elnazir Ramadan	Qatar	5:49.79	PB
10	Patrick Karl	Germany	5:49.96	PB
11	Soufien Cherni	Tunisia	5:50.31	PB
12	Tobias Wolter	Canada	5:52.36	
13	Andreas Jansson	Sweden	5:52.44	PB
14	Haran Dunderdale	Great Britain	5:56.23	
15	Mateusz Kaczmarek	Poland	5:58.18	
