= Jonathan Kitilit =

Kenyan runner

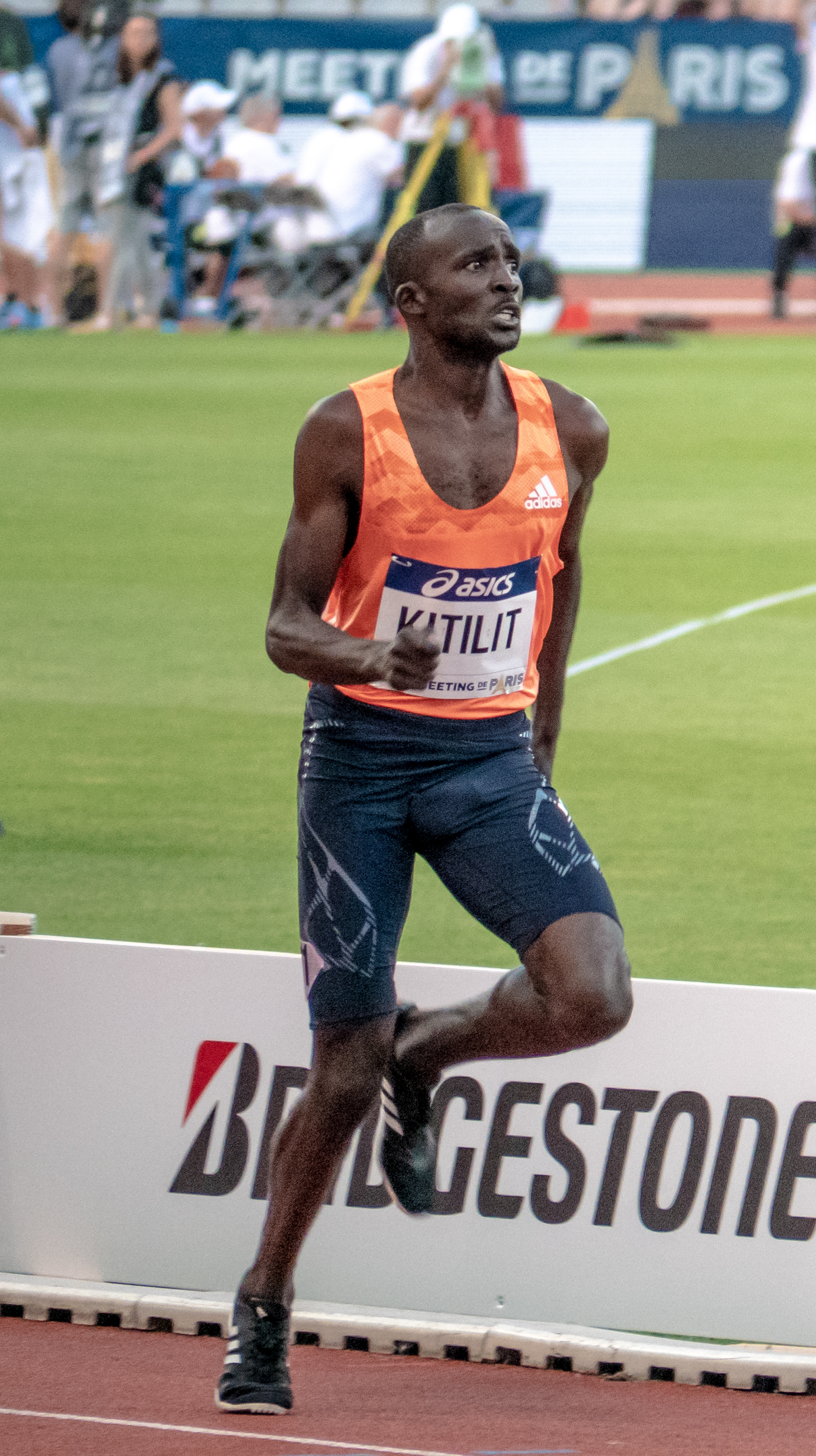
- Kitilit in 2018

Personal information
- Full name: Jonathan Kiprotich Kitilit
- Born: 24 April 1994 (age 32) Trans-Nzoia County, Kenya
- Height: 1.74 m (5 ft 9 in)
- Weight: 62 kg (137 lb)

Sport
- Sport: Athletics
- Event(s): 800 metres, 1000 metres

Achievements and titles
- Highest world ranking: 2 (800m)

Jonathan Kiprotich Kitilit (born 24 April 1994) is a Kenyan middle-distance runner specialising in the 800 metres. His personal best time is 1:43.05, which he ran in Paris on 27 August 2016.

== Personal bests ==
Outdoor

- 800 metres – 1:43.05 (Paris 2016)
- 1000 metres – 2:13.95 (Lausanne 2016)
- 1500 metres – 3:39.81 (Turku 2015)
