= Ahmed Bader Magour =

Qatari javelin thrower

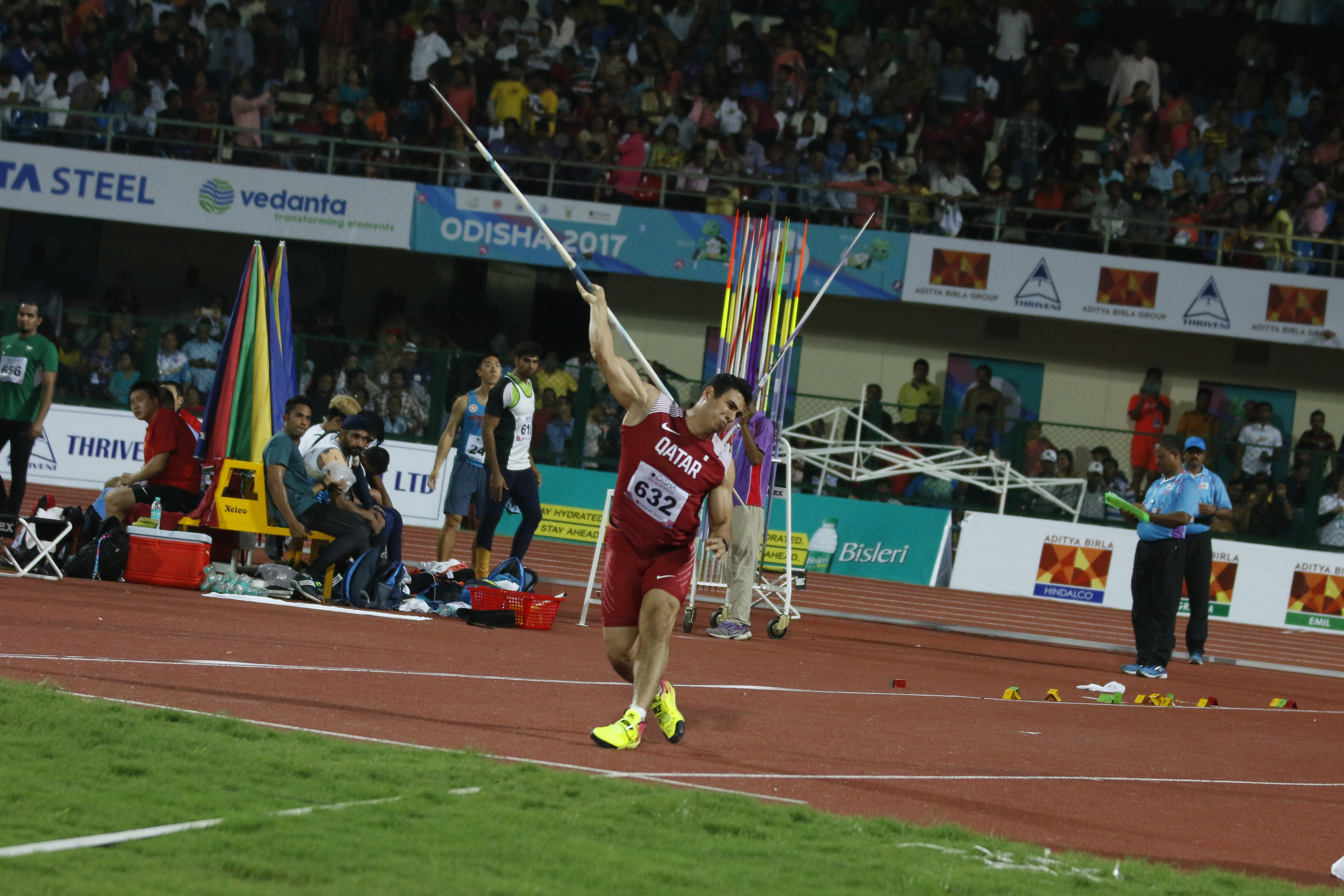

Personal information
- Full name: Ahmed Bader Magour
- Nationality: Qatari
- Born: 3 March 1996 (age 30) Egypt

Sport
- Sport: Track and field
- Event: Javelin throw
- Coached by: Don Babbitt

Achievements and titles
- Personal best: JT (800g): 85.23 m
Medal record
Men's athletics
Representing Qatar
Asian Championships
Silver medal – second place	2017 Bhubaneshwar	Javelin throw

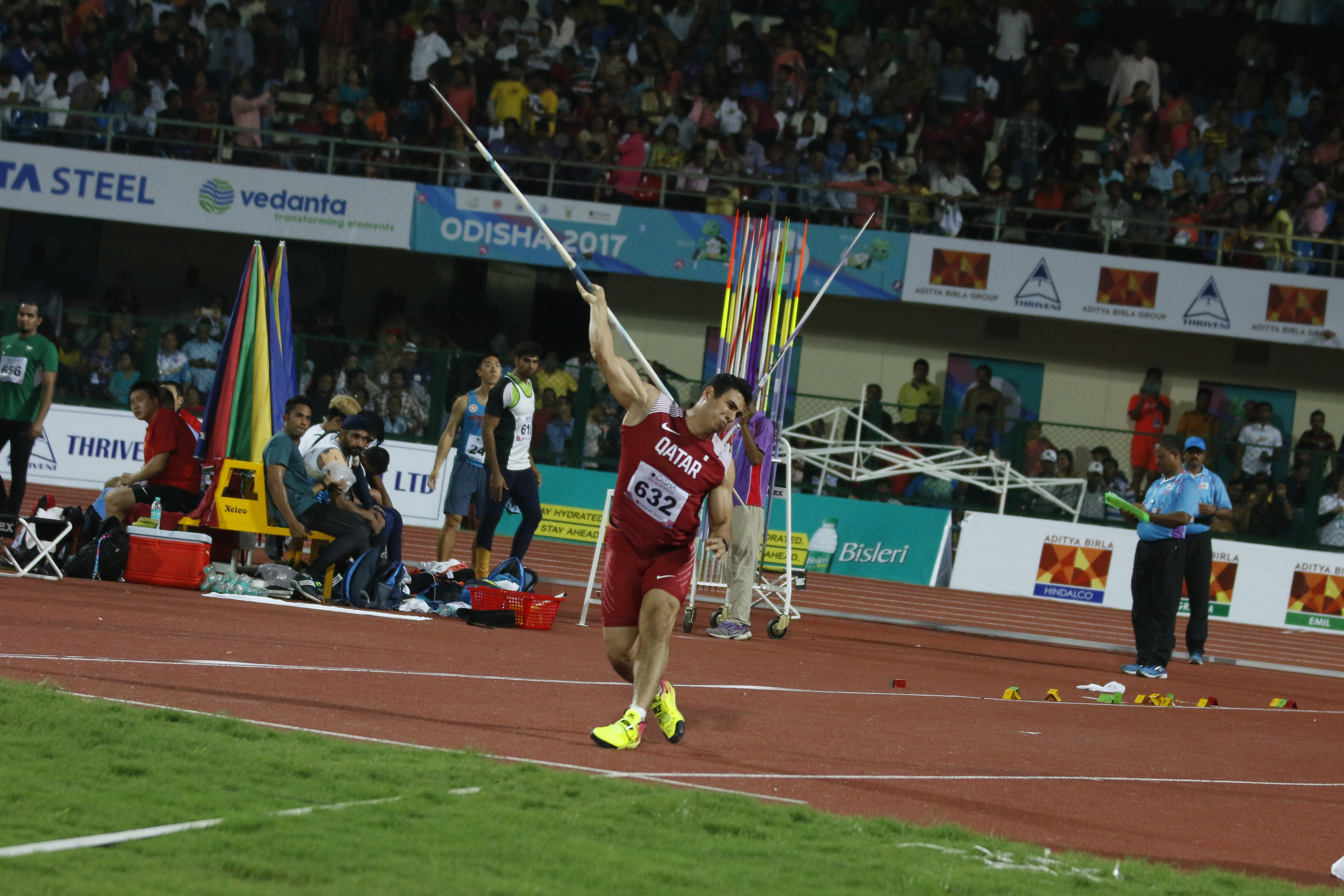
Ahmed Bader Magour in 2017

Ahmed Bader Magour (born March 3, 1996) is a Qatari athlete specializing in the Javelin Throw. He competed at the 2016 Summer Olympics in the men's javelin throw; his result of 77.19 meters in the qualifying round placed him 30th overall. He did not progress to the finals.

== Seasonal bests by year ==
- 2015 - 77.88
- 2016 - 84.74
- 2017 - 85.23
- 2022 - 74.28
