= Nicholas Kiptanui Bett =

Kenyan steeplechase runner (born 1996)

Personal information
- Nationality: Kenyan
- Born: December 20, 1996 (age 29)
- Height: 172 cm (5 ft 7 1/2 in)
- Weight: 52 kg (115 lb)

Sport
- Sport: Athletics
- Event: 3000 metres steeplechase

Achievements and titles
- Personal bests: 3KSC: 8:10.07 (2016); 2KSC: 5:20.92 NYB (2013)
Medal record
Men's athletics
Representing Kenya
World U18 Championships
Silver medal – second place	2013 Donetsk	2000 m steeplechase

Nicholas Kiptanui Bett (also known as Nicholas Kiptonui Bett or Nicholas Bett; born 20 December 1996) is a Kenyan steeplechase runner. He is the national under-18 record holder for Kenya in the 2000 metres steeplechase with a time of 5:20.92.

== Biography ==
Bett's first international championship was at the 2013 IAAF World Youth Championships, where at just 16 years old he set the Kenyan record in the rarely run 2013 World Youth Championships in Athletics – Boys' 2000 metres steeplechase. Bett also ran faster than the previous world under-18 best, but was beaten by Meresa Kahsay of Ethiopia.

Starting in 2015, Bett was regular on the Diamond League steeplechase circuit, cementing top-10 finishes in the Shanghai, Rome, Stockholm, Birmingham, and Brussels meetings.

Most notably, Bett finished 2nd in the 2016 Athletissima Lausanne as a 19-year old. After reigning Diamond League champion Jairus Birech faded from the quick early pace, Bett led the race coming into the final water jump, but Abraham Kibiwott passed him before the final barrier for the win.

== Statistics ==
=== Personal bests ===
Event	Mark	Competition	Venue	Date
3000 metres steeplechase	8:10.07	Lausanne Diamond League	Lausanne, Switzerland	25 August 2016
2000 metres steeplechase	5:20.92 NU18B	2013 IAAF World Youth Championships	Donetsk, Ukraine	12 July 2013
