= Raven Clay =

American hurdler (born 1990)

Personal information
- Nationality: American
- Born: October 5, 1990 (age 35)
- Height: 168 cm (5 ft 6 in)
- Weight: 59 kg (130 lb)

Sport
- Sport: Athletics
- Event(s): 100 metres hurdles, 60 metres hurdles
- College team: Findlay Oilers
- Club: Elite Athletes International

Achievements and titles
- Personal bests: 100mH: 12.93 (+2.0) (2016); 60mH: 8.09 (2017)
Medal record
Women's athletics
Representing United States
Pan American Junior Athletics Championships
Bronze medal – third place	2009 Port of Spain	100 m hurdles

Raven Clay (born October 5, 1990) is an American former short hurdler. She was the 2012 NCAA Division II national champion in the 60 metres hurdles indoors, and she won a bronze medal at the 2009 Pan American Junior Championships in the 100 metres hurdles.

== Biography ==
Clay grew up in Detroit, Michigan where she attended (now defunct) Cooley High School and Frank Cody High School. In 2009, she won a bronze medal at the 2009 Pan American Junior Championships in the 100 m hurdles.

From 2009 to 2012, Clay competed for the Findlay Oilers track and field team, an NCAA Division II program. During her time at Findlay, Clay set four school records and won an NCAA Division II women's indoor track and field championships national title in the 60 metres hurdles her senior year.

In 2017, Clay competed in the Oslo Diamond League, finishing 8th place and scoring one point in the 2017 Diamond League season. Clay trains with Elite Athletes International.

== Statistics ==
=== Personal bests ===
Event	Mark	Competition	Venue	Date
100 metres hurdles	12.93 (+2.0 m/s)	Miami Hurricane Alumni Invitational	Coral Gables, Florida	9 April 2016
60 metres hurdles	8.09	Orlen Cup	Łódź, Poland	16 February 2017
