= 2017 Diamond League =

2017 IAAF Diamond League
- Edition: 8th
- Dates: 5 May – 1 September
- Events: 32
- Meetings: 14
- Individual Prize Money (US$): US$ 8 million

The 2017 IAAF Diamond League was the eighth season of the annual series of outdoor track and field meetings, organised by the International Association of Athletics Federations (IAAF). It is the first to feature the new championship-style system in which overall event winners are determined only by the results of the final meet.

== Changes ==
The Diamond League's format was completely overhauled for the 2017 edition. The Diamond Race system used in previous years, in which athletes accumulated points through the season with double points in the finals, was replaced with a championship-style format in which earlier meets act as qualifying meets for the finals; the top eight or twelve athletes, depending on the event, will qualify. The two final meetings are held at the end of the season in Zürich (Weltklasse) and Brussels (Memorial Van Damme), with half of the 32 events contested in each final; the overall Diamond League championship in each event will be determined solely by the results of the finals. While not previously used in the Diamond League, this new system is similar to the old IAAF Grand Prix circuit with its IAAF Grand Prix Final.

Scoring in the non-final meets was extended from the top six to the top eight, with the winner receiving eight points and the runner-up seven, down to one point for an eighth-place finish. Instead of all 32 events appearing in six meets and the final, half of the events now appear in only four qualifying meets in addition to the final; the remaining events are still contested in six qualifying meets and the final. A controversial field event rule change from 2016, under which only the top four athletes after three rounds were allowed the full six attempts, was reverted for 2017.

=== Disciplines ===
Diamond League track events
Men	100 m	200 m	400 m	800 m	1500 m	5000 m	110 m hurdles	400 m hurdles	3000 m steeplechase
Women	100 m	200 m	400 m	800 m	1500 m	5000 m	100 m hurdles	400 m hurdles	3000 m steeplechase

Diamond League field events
Men	Pole vault	High jump	Long jump	Triple jump	Shot put	Discus throw	Javelin throw
Women	Pole vault	High jump	Long jump	Triple jump	Shot put	Discus throw	Javelin throw

=== Points system ===
A new points system was adopted for the 2017 Diamond League, with the winner of an event at a qualifying meet receiving eight points and the runner-up seven, down to one point for the athlete in eighth place; at the end of the year, the eight or twelve athletes with the most points, depending on the event, will qualify for the finals. In case of a tie on points, the best legal mark during the qualifying phase will determine the athlete who qualifies.

Place	Points
1st	8
2nd	7
3rd	6
4th	5
5th	4
6th	3
7th	2
8th	1

== Schedule ==
The following fourteen meetings are scheduled to be included in the 2017 season:

Date	Meet	Stadium	City	Country
5 May	Doha Diamond League	Qatar SC Stadium	Doha	Qatar
13 May	IAAF Diamond League Shanghai	Shanghai Stadium	Shanghai	China
27 May	Prefontaine Classic	Hayward Field	Eugene	United States
8 June	Golden Gala – Pietro Mennea	Stadio Olimpico	Rome	Italy
15 June	Bislett Games	Bislett Stadium	Oslo	Norway
18 June	Bauhausgalan	Stockholm Olympic Stadium	Stockholm	Sweden
1 July	Meeting de Paris	Stade Sébastien Charléty	Paris	France
6 July	Athletissima	Stade Olympique de la Pontaise	Lausanne	Switzerland
9 July	Müller Anniversary Games	London Stadium	London	United Kingdom
16 July	Meeting International Mohammed VI d'Athlétisme de Rabat	Prince Moulay Abdellah Stadium	Rabat	Morocco
21 July	Herculis	Stade Louis II	Monaco	Monaco
20 August	Müller Grand Prix Birmingham	Alexander Stadium	Birmingham	United Kingdom
24 August	Weltklasse Zürich	Letzigrund	Zürich	Switzerland
1 September	AG Memorial Van Damme	King Baudouin Stadium	Brussels	Belgium

== Season overview ==
- Events held at Diamond League meets, but not included in the Diamond League points race, are marked in grey background.
- Diamond league final winners are marked with light blue background.

=== Men ===
==== Track ====
#	Meeting	100 m	200 m	400 m	800 m	1500 m	5000 m	110 m h	400 m h	3000 m st
1	Doha	Akani Simbine (RSA); 9.99	-	Steven Gardiner (BAH); 44.60	-	Elijah Manangoi (KEN); 3:31.90 WL	Ronald Kwemoi (KEN); 7:28.73 WL (3000 m)	-	Abderrahman Samba (QAT); 48.44	-
2	Shanghai	Su Bingtian (CHN); 10.09	Noah Lyles (USA); 19.90 =WL, PB	-	Kipyegon Bett (KEN); 1:44.70	-	-	Omar McLeod (JAM); 13.09	Bershawn Jackson (USA); 48.63 MR, SB	-
3	Eugene	Ronnie Baker (USA); 9.86w	-	LaShawn Merritt (USA); 44.79	-	Ronald Kwemoi (KEN); 3:49.04 WL, PB (Mile)	Mo Farah (GBR); 13:00.70 WL	Omar McLeod (JAM); 13.01 WL	-	-
4	Rome	Chijindu Ujah (GBR); 10.02 SB	Andre De Grasse (CAN); 20.01 SB	-	Adam Kszczot (POL); 1:45.96	-	-	Aries Merritt (USA); 13.13 =SB	-	Conseslus Kipruto (KEN); 8:04.63
5	Oslo	Andre De Grasse (CAN); 10.01 SB	-	Baboloki Thebe (BOT); 44.95	-	Jake Wightman (GBR); 3:34.17 PB	-	-	Karsten Warholm (NOR); 48.25 NR	-
6	Stockholm	Andre De Grasse (CAN); 9.69w	-	Steven Gardiner (BAH); 44.58	-	Timothy Cheruiyot (KEN); 3:30.77 WL, PB	-	Orlando Ortega (ESP); 13.09 w	Karsten Warholm (NOR); 48.82	Soufiane El Bakkali (MAR); 8:15.01
7	Paris	Ben Youssef Meité (CIV); 9.99 SB	Ramil Guliyev (TUR); 20.15	-	Nijel Amos (BOT); 1:44.24 SB	-	Muktar Edris (ETH); 7:32.31 PB (3000 m)	Ronald Levy (JAM); 13.05 PB	-	-
8	Lausanne	Justin Gatlin (USA); 9.96	-	Wayde van Niekerk (RSA); 43.62 WL, DLR, MR	-	Aman Wote (ETH); 3:32.20	Muktar Edris (ETH); 12:55.23 WL, MR	-	Kariem Hussein (SUI); 48.79 SB	-
9	London	Chijindu Ujah (GBR); 10.02 =SB	Ameer Webb (USA); 20.13	Michael Cherry (USA); 45.02	Nijel Amos (BOT); 1:43.18 WL	Chris O'Hare (GBR); 3:34.75	Mo Farah (GBR); 7:35.15 SB (3000 m)	Aries Merritt (USA); 13.09 SB	Kerron Clement (USA); 48.02 SB	-
10	Rabat	Chijindu Ujah (GBR); 9.98 MR	Andre De Grasse (CAN); 20.03 MR	-	Nijel Amos (BOT); 1:43.91	-	Abdelaati Iguider (MAR); 7:37.82 SB (3000 m)	-	-	Soufiane El Bakkali (MAR); 8:05.12 PB
11	Monaco	Usain Bolt (JAM); 9.95 SB	-	Wayde van Niekerk (RSA); 43.73 MR	Emmanuel Korir (KEN); 1:43.10 WL, PB	Elijah Manangoi (KEN); 3:28.80 WL	-	-	-	Evan Jager (USA); 8:01.29 WL
12	Birmingham	Chijindu Ujah (GBR); 10.08	Ramil Guliyev (TUR); 20.17	Dwayne Cowan (GBR); 45.34 PB	Nijel Amos (BOT); 1:44.50	Jake Wightman (GBR); 3:54.92 (Mile)	Mo Farah (GBR); 7:38.64 (3000 m)	Aries Merritt (USA); 13.29	-	-
13	Zürich	Chijindu Ujah (GBR); 9.97 SB	-	Isaac Makwala (BOT); 43.95	-	Timothy Cheruiyot (KEN); 3:33.93	Mo Farah (GBR); 13:06.05	-	Kyron McMaster (BVI); 48.07	-
14	Brussels	-	Noah Lyles (USA); 20.00	-	Nijel Amos (BOT); 1:44.53	Elijah Manangoi (KEN); 3:38.97	-	Sergey Shubenkov (ANA); 13.14	-	Conseslus Kipruto (KEN); 8:04.73

==== Field ====
#	Meeting	Long jump	Triple jump	High jump	Pole vault	Shot put	Discus	Javelin
1	Doha	-	Christian Taylor (USA); 17.25	Mutaz Essa Barshim (QAT); 2.36 WL	-	-	-	Thomas Röhler (GER); 93.90 WL, DLR, MR, NR
2	Shanghai	Luvo Manyonga (RSA); 8.61 DLR, MR	-	Mutaz Essa Barshim (QAT); 2.33	Sam Kendricks (USA); 5.88 SB	-	Philip Milanov (BEL); 64.94 SB	-
3	Eugene	-	Christian Taylor (USA); 18.11 WL, DLR, MR	-	Sam Kendricks (USA); 5.86	Ryan Crouser (USA); 22.43 MR	-	-
4	Rome	-	-	-	-	-	-	Thomas Röhler (GER); 90.06
5	Oslo	-	-	Mutaz Essa Barshim (QAT); 2.38 WL, MR	-	-	Daniel Ståhl (SWE); 68.06	-
6	Stockholm	Luvo Manyonga (RSA); 8.36	-	-	-	-	Fedrick Dacres (JAM); 68.36	-
7	Paris	-	Christian Taylor (USA); 17.29 +0.0	Mutaz Essa Barshim (QAT); 2.35	Sam Kendricks (USA); 5.82	-	-	Johannes Vetter (GER); 88.74
8	Lausanne	-	Pedro Pablo Pichardo (CUB); 17.60 SB	-	Sam Kendricks (USA); 5.93 MR	Ryan Crouser (USA); 22.39 MR	-	-
9	London	Jeff Henderson (USA); 8.17	-	-	-	-	Daniel Ståhl (SWE); 66.73	-
10	Rabat	Rushwal Samaai (RSA); 8.35	-	Andriy Protsenko (UKR); 2.29	Pawel Wojciechowski (POL); 5.85	Ryan Crouser (USA); 22.47 MR	-	-
11	Monaco	-	-	-	Piotr Lisek (POL); 5.82 =PB	-	-	Thomas Röhler (GER); 89.17
12	Birmingham	Jarrion Lawson (USA); 8.19	-	Mutaz Essa Barshim (QAT); 2.40 WL, MR	-	Tomas Walsh (NZL); 21.83	-	-
13	Zürich	Luvo Manyonga (RSA); 8.49	-	Mutaz Essa Barshim (QAT); 2.36	Sam Kendricks (USA); 5.87	-	-	Jakub Vadlejch (CZE); 88.50
14	Brussels	-	Christian Taylor (USA); 17.49	-	-	Darrell Hill (USA); 22.44 MR, PB	Andrius Gudžius (LTU); 68.16	-

=== Women ===
==== Track ====
#	Meeting	100 m	200 m	400 m	800 m	1500 m	5000 m	100 m h	400 m h	3000 m st
1	Doha	-	Elaine Thompson (JAM); 22.19 SB	-	Caster Semenya (RSA); 1:56.61 WL, MR	-	-	Kendra Harrison (USA); 12.59	-	Hyvin Jepkemoi (KEN); 9:00.12 WL, MR
2	Shanghai	Elaine Thompson (JAM); 10.78 WL	-	Shaunae Miller-Uibo (BAH); 49.77 WL	-	Faith Kipyegon (KEN); 3:59.22 WL	Hellen Obiri (KEN); 14:22.47 WL, PB	-	-	Ruth Jebet (BHR); 9:04.78 MR
3	Eugene	Morolake Akinosun (USA); 10.94w	Tori Bowie (USA); 21.77 WL, MR, PB	-	Caster Semenya (RSA); 1:57.78	Faith Kipyegon (KEN); 3:59.67	Genzebe Dibaba (ETH); 14:25.22 SB	Jasmin Stowers (USA); 12.59 SB	Ashley Spencer (USA); 53.38 WL, PB	Celliphine Chespol (KEN); 8:58.78 WL, WJR, AR, MR
4	Rome	Dafne Schippers (NED); 10.99	-	Natasha Hastings (USA); 50.52 SB	-	Sifan Hassan (NED); 3:56.22 WL, MR	Hellen Obiri (KEN); 14:18.37 WL, NR	-	Janieve Russell (JAM); 54.14 SB	-
5	Oslo	-	Dafne Schippers (NED); 22.31	-	Caster Semenya (RSA); 1:57.59	-	-	Pamela Dutkiewicz (GER); 12.73	-	Norah Jeruto (KEN); 9:17.27
6	Stockholm	-	Murielle Ahouré (CIV); 22.68 SB	-	Francine Niyonsaba (BDI); 1:59.11	-	-	-	-	-
7	Paris	Elaine Thompson (JAM); 10.91	-	Novlene Williams-Mills (JAM); 51.03	-	Sifan Hassan (NED); 3:57.10	-	-	-	Beatrice Chepkoech (KEN); 9:01.69
8	Lausanne	-	Dafne Schippers (NED); 22.10 SB	-	Francine Niyonsaba (BDI); 1:56.82 SB	Genzebe Dibaba (ETH); 4:16.05 WL, MR (Mile)	-	Sharika Nelvis (USA); 12.53 SB	Ashley Spencer (USA); 53.90	-
9	London	Elaine Thompson (JAM); 10.94	-	Allyson Felix (USA); 49.65 WL	Charlene Lipsey (USA); 1:59.43	Hellen Obiri (KEN); 4:16.56 MR, NR (Mile)	-	Kendra Harrison (USA); 12.39	Janieve Russell (JAM); 54.02 SB	-
10	Rabat	Elaine Thompson (JAM); 10.87 MR	-	Shaunae Miller-Uibo (BAH); 49.80 MR	-	Angelika Cichocka (POL); 4:01.93	-	-	Zuzana Hejnová (CZE); 54.22 SB	Gesa Felicitas Krause (GER); 9:18.87
11	Monaco	-	Marie-Josée Ta Lou (CIV); 22.25	-	Caster Semenya (RSA); 1:55.27 WL, DLR, MR, NR	-	Hellen Obiri (KEN); 8:23.14 WL (3000 m)	Kendra Harrison (USA); 12.51	Kori Carter (USA); 53.36	-
12	Birmingham	Elaine Thompson (JAM); 10.97	-	Salwa Eid Naser (BHR); 50.59	Habitam Alemu (ETH); 1:59.60	Dawit Seyaum (ETH); 4:01.36	Sifan Hassan (NED); 8:28.90 MR, NR (3000 m)	-	Zuzana Hejnová (CZE); 54.18 SB	-
13	Zürich	Christania Williams (JAM); 11.07	Shaunae Miller-Uibo (BAH); 21.88 NR	-	Caster Semenya (RSA); 1:55.84	-	-	Sally Pearson (AUS); 12.55	Zuzana Hejnová (CZE); 54.13 SB	Ruth Jebet (BHR); 8:55.29 WL, MR
14	Brussels	Elaine Thompson (JAM); 10.92	-	Shaunae Miller-Uibo (BAH); 49.46 WL, SB	-	Faith Kipyegon (KEN); 3:57.04 SB	Hellen Obiri (KEN); 14:25.88	-	Dalilah Muhammad (USA); 53.89	-

==== Field ====
#	Meeting	Long jump	Triple jump	High jump	Pole vault	Shot put	Discus	Javelin
1	Doha	-	-	-	Katerina Stefanidi (GRE); 4.80 EL	Michelle Carter (USA); 19.32 SB	-	-
2	Shanghai	-	-	-	-	Gong Lijiao (CHN); 19.46 SB	Sandra Perković (CRO); 66.94	-
3	Eugene	Brittney Reese (USA); 7.01 WL	-	Mariya Lasitskene (ANA); 2.03 WL, MR	-	-	-	Tatsiana Khaladovich (BLR); 66.30 SB
4	Rome	-	Yulimar Rojas (VEN); 14.84	Mariya Lasitskene (ANA); 2.00	Katerina Stefanidi (GRE); 4.85 WL	Gong Lijiao (CHN); 19.56 SB	-	-
5	Oslo	Tianna Bartoletta (USA); 6.79	-	-	Yarisley Silva (CUB); 4.81 SB	-	Sandra Perković (CRO); 66.79	-
6	Stockholm	-	-	Mariya Lasitskene (ANA); 2.00	Nicole Büchler (SUI); 4.65 SB	-	Yaime Pérez (CUB); 67.92 SB	-
7	Paris	-	-	-	-	Gong Lijiao (CHN); 19.14	-	-
8	Lausanne	Ivana Spanovic (SRB); 6.79	-	Mariya Lasitskene (ANA); 2.06 WL, DLR, MR	-	-	-	Sara Kolak (CRO); 68.43 WL, MR, NR
9	London	Tianna Bartoletta (USA); 7.01 SB, MR	-	Mariya Lasitskene (ANA); 2.00	Katerina Stefanidi (GRE); 4.81	-	-	Barbora Špotáková (CZE); 68.26 SB, MR
10	Rabat	-	Caterine Ibargüen (COL); 14.51	-	-	-	-	Barbora Špotáková (CZE); 63.73
11	Monaco	-	Caterine Ibargüen (COL); 14.86 SB	Mariya Lasitskene (ANA); 2.05 MR	-	-	-	-
12	Birmingham	-	Caterine Ibargüen (COL); 14.51	-	Katerina Stefanidi (GRE); 4.75	-	Sandra Perković (CRO); 67.51	-
13	Zürich	-	Olga Rypakova (KAZ); 14.55	-	Katerina Stefanidi (GRE); 4.87 DLR MR	Gong Lijiao (CHN); 19.60	-	Barbora Špotáková (CZE); 65.54
14	Brussels	Ivana Spanovic (SRB); 6.70	-	Mariya Lasitskene (ANA); 2.02	Katerina Stefanidi (GRE); 4.85	-	Sandra Perković (CRO); 68.82	-

== Results ==
Doha
Event	1st +8 pts	2nd +7 pts	3rd +6 pts	4th +5 pts	5th +4 pts	6th +3 pts	7th +2 pts	8th +1 pts
Men's 100m (-1.2 m/s)	Akani Simbine; RSA | 9.99	Asafa Powell; JAM | 10.08	Femi Ogunode; QAT | 10.13	Justin Gatlin; USA | 10.14	Andre de Grasse; CAN | 10.21	Ben Youssef Meité; CIV | 10.21	Ronnie Baker; USA | 10.24	Kim Collins; SKN | 10.33
Men's 400m	Steven Gardiner; BAH | 44.60	LaShawn Merritt; USA | 44.78	Tony McQuay; USA | 44.92	Karabo Sibanda; BOT | 45.05	Vernon Norwood; USA | 45.41	Luguelín Santos; DOM | 45.55	Pavel Maslák; CZE | 45.59	Liemarvin Bonevacia; NED | 45.95
Men's 1500m	Elijah Motonei Manangoi; KEN | 3:31.90	Silas Kiplagat; KEN | 3:32.23	Bethwell Birgen; KEN | 3:32.27	Vincent Kibet; KEN | 3:32.66	Timothy Cheruiyot; KEN | 3:32.87	Robert Biwott; KEN | 3:34.30	Ryan Gregson; AUS | 3:34.56	Aman Wote; ETH | 3:34.81
Men's 3000m	Ronald Kwemoi; KEN | 7:28.73	Paul Chelimo; USA | 7:31.57	Yomif Kejelcha; ETH | 7:32.27	Caleb Mwangangi Ndiku; KEN | 7:33.36	Albert Rop; BRN | 7:38.30	Muktar Edris; ETH | 7:40.97	Jacob Kiplimo; UGA | 7:43.73	Andrew Butchart; GBR | 7:45.36
Men's High Jump	Mutaz Essa Barshim; QAT | 2.36 m	Robbie Grabarz; GBR | 2.31 m	Donald Thomas; BAH | 2.29 m	Majd Eddin Ghazal; SYR | 2.29 m	Luis Castro Rivera; PUR | 2.26 m	Erik Kynard; USA | 2.26 m	Chris Baker; GBR | 2.26 m	Andrii Protsenko; UKR | 2.26 m
Men's Triple Jump	Christian Taylor; USA | 17.25 m	Omar Craddock; USA | 17.08 m	Alexis Copello; AZE | 16.81 m	Bin Dong; CHN | 16.76 m	Troy Doris; GUY | 16.58 m	Jhon Murillo; COL | 16.40 m	Karol Hoffmann; POL | 16.13 m	Rashid Ahmed al Mannai; QAT | 15.52 m
Men's Javelin Throw	Thomas Röhler; GER | 93.90 m	Johannes Vetter; GER | 89.68 m	Jakub Vadlejch; CZE | 87.91 m	Tero Pitkämäki; FIN | 84.26 m	Ahmed Bader Magour; QAT | 83.18 m	Hamish Peacock; AUS | 82.97 m	Julius Yego; KEN | 81.94 m	Kim Amb; SWE | 80.85 m
Women's 200m (-2.3 m/s)	Elaine Thompson-Herah; JAM | 22.19	Dafne Schippers; NED | 22.45	Marie-Josée Ta Lou; CIV | 22.77	Simone Facey; JAM | 23.00	Veronica Campbell-Brown; JAM | 23.09	Blessing Okagbare; NGR | 23.15	Desiree Henry; GBR | 23.22	Joanna Atkins; USA | 23.32
Women's 800m	Caster Semenya; RSA | 1:56.61	Margaret Nyairera Wambui; KEN | 1:57.03	Eunice Jepkoech Sum; KEN | 1:58.76	Habitam Alemu; ETH | 1:58.92	Genzebe Dibaba; ETH | 1:59.37	Charlene Lipsey; USA | 2:00.29	Malika Akkaoui; MAR | 2:01.13	Natoya Goule-Toppin; JAM | 2:01.59
Women's 100mH (-2.3 m/s)	Kendra Harrison; USA | 12.59	Cindy Roleder; GER | 12.90	Sharika Nelvis; USA | 12.91	Christina Clemons; USA | 13.05	Megan Tapper; JAM | 13.13	Phylicia George; CAN | 13.14	Cindy Sember; GBR | 13.42	Nia Ali; USA | 14.34
Women's 3000mSC	Hyvin Kiyeng; KEN | 9:00.12	Beatrice Chepkoech; KEN | 9:01.57	Ruth Jebet; BRN | 9:01.99	Celliphine Chepteek Chespol; KEN | 9:05.70	Emma Coburn; USA | 9:14.53	Sofia Assefa; ETH | 9:15.66	Gesa Felicitas Krause; GER | 9:15.70	Aisha Praught-Leer; JAM | 9:19.29
Women's Pole Vault	Aikaterini Stefanidi; GRE | 4.80 m	Sandi Morris; USA | 4.75 m	Yarisley Silva; CUB | 4.65 m	Holly Bradshaw; GBR | 4.55 m	Lisa Ryzih; GER | 4.55 m	Katie Moon; USA | 4.45 m	Alysha Newman; CAN | 4.25 m	Kristen Brown; USA | 4.25 m
Women's Shot Put	Michelle Carter; USA | 19.32 m	Anita Márton; HUN | 18.99 m	Aliona Dubitskaya; BLR | 18.90 m	Yuliya Leantsiuk; BLR | 18.22 m	Cleopatra Borel; TTO | 17.96 m	Brittany Smith; USA | 17.84 m	Noora Salem Jasim; BRN | 17.69 m	Melissa Boekelman; NED | 17.43 m

Shanghai
Event	1st +8 pts	2nd +7 pts	3rd +6 pts	4th +5 pts	5th +4 pts	6th +3 pts	7th +2 pts	8th +1 pts
Men's 200m (-0.4 m/s)	Noah Lyles; USA | 19.90	LaShawn Merritt; USA | 20.27	Adam Gemili; GBR | 20.35	Ameer Webb; USA | 20.39	Zhenye Xie; CHN | 20.40	Aaron Brown; CAN | 20.41	Churandy Martina; NED | 20.62	Brendon Rodney; CAN | 20.63
Men's 800m	Kipyegon Bett; KEN | 1:44.70	Robert Biwott; KEN | 1:45.15	Ferguson Cheruiyot Rotich; KEN | 1:45.17	David Rudisha; KEN | 1:45.36	Alfred Kipketer; KEN | 1:45.40	Adam Kszczot; POL | 1:45.45	Marcin Lewandowski; POL | 1:45.87	Brandon McBride; CAN | 1:46.40
Men's 110mH (+0.5 m/s)	Omar McLeod; JAM | 13.09	Orlando Ortega; ESP | 13.15	Wenjun Xie; CHN | 13.31	Hansle Parchment; JAM | 13.35	Sergey Shubenkov; ANA | 13.35	Aries Merritt; USA | 13.36	Gregor Traber; GER | 13.41	David Oliver; USA | 13.62
Men's 400mH	Bershawn Jackson; USA | 48.63	LJ van Zyl; RSA | 49.35	Rasmus Mägi; EST | 49.38	Kerron Clement; USA | 49.43	Javier Culson; PUR | 49.90	Kariem Hussein; SUI | 50.02	Annsert Whyte; JAM | 50.18	Nicholas Bett; KEN | 51.09
Men's High Jump	Mutaz Essa Barshim; QAT | 2.33 m	Wang Yu; CHN | 2.30 m	Andrii Protsenko; UKR | 2.27 m	Erik Kynard; USA | 2.24 m	Zhang Guowei; CHN | 2.24 m	Sylwester Bednarek; POL | 2.24 m	Michael Mason; CAN | 2.20 m	Robbie Grabarz; GBR | 2.20 m
Men's Pole Vault	Sam Kendricks; USA | 5.88 m	Renaud Lavillenie; FRA | 5.83 m	Shawnacy Barber; CAN | 5.60 m	Thiago Braz; BRA | 5.60 m	Konstantinos Filippidis; GRE | 5.50 m	Raphael Holzdeppe; GER | 5.50 m	Stanley Joseph; FRA | 5.40 m	Yao Jie; CHN | 5.40 m
Men's Long Jump	Luvo Manyonga; RSA | 8.61 m	Xinglong Gao; CHN | 8.22 m	Changzhou Huang; CHN | 8.20 m	Yaoguang Zhang; CHN | 8.19 m	Ruswahl Samaai; RSA | 8.18 m	Jeff Henderson; USA | 8.03 m	Emiliano Lasa; URU | 7.90 m	Godfrey Khotso Mokoena; RSA | 7.85 m
Men's Discus Throw	Philip Milanov; BEL | 64.94 m	Piotr Małachowski; POL | 64.36 m	Daniel Ståhl; SWE | 64.14 m	Lukas Weißhaidinger; AUT | 63.71 m	Christoph Harting; GER | 63.47 m	Robert Urbanek; POL | 61.94 m	Daniel Jasinski; GER | 59.44 m	Martin Kupper; EST | 57.97 m
Women's 100m (-0.3 m/s)	Elaine Thompson-Herah; JAM | 10.78	Tori Bowie; USA | 11.04	Marie-Josée Ta Lou; CIV | 11.07	Michelle-Lee Ahye; TTO | 11.21	Murielle Ahouré-Demps; CIV | 11.22	Veronica Campbell-Brown; JAM | 11.23	Morolake Akinosun; USA | 11.24	Christania Williams; JAM | 11.33
Women's 400m	Shaunae Miller-Uibo; BAH | 49.77	Natasha Hastings; USA | 50.74	Olha Zemlyak; UKR | DQ (Note: Disqualified after competition due to antidoping rule violation)	Novlene Williams-Mills; JAM | 51.45	Anneisha McLaughlin-Whilby; JAM | 51.63	Justyna Święty-Ersetic; POL | 51.64	Stephenie Ann McPherson; JAM | 51.97	Morgan Mitchell; AUS | 52.23
Women's 1500m	Faith Kipyegon; KEN | 3:59.22	Dawit Seyaum; ETH | 4:00.52	Besu Sado; ETH | 4:03.10	Rababe Arafi; MAR | 4:04.94	Malika Akkaoui; MAR | 4:05.83	Angelika Cichocka; POL | 4:06.23	Claudia Mihaela Bobocea; ROU | 4:06.33	Katie Mackey; USA | 4:07.15
Women's 5000m	Hellen Obiri; KEN | 14:22.47	Senbere Teferi; ETH | 14:31.76	Letesenbet Gidey; ETH | 14:36.84	Margaret Chelimo Kipkemboi; KEN | 14:45.95	Caroline Chepkoech Kipkirui; KEN | 14:51.87	Sofia Assefa; ETH | 14:56.37	Sentayehu Lewetegn; ETH | 15:08.57	Mercyline Chelangat; UGA | 15:09.45
Women's Shot Put	Lijiao Gong; CHN | 19.46 m	Daniella Hill; USA | 18.98 m	Anita Márton; HUN | 18.69 m	Ka Bian; CHN | 18.18 m	Brittany Smith; USA | 17.95 m	Melissa Boekelman; NED | 17.83 m	Yuliya Leantsiuk; BLR | 17.70 m	Cleopatra Borel; TTO | 17.64 m
Women's Discus Throw	Sandra Perković; CRO | 66.94 m	Dani Stevens; AUS | 66.47 m	Denia Caballero; CUB | 65.76 m	Nadine Müller; GER | 64.36 m	Yaimé Pérez; CUB | 63.79 m	Xinyue Su; CHN | 62.87 m	Julia Harting; GER | 62.49 m	Melina Robert-Michon; FRA | 61.43 m

Eugene
Event	1st +8 pts	2nd +7 pts	3rd +6 pts	4th +5 pts	5th +4 pts	6th +3 pts	7th +2 pts	8th +1 pts
Men's 100m (+2.4 m/s)	Ronnie Baker; USA | 9.86	Bingtian Su; CHN | 9.92	Chijindu Ujah; GBR | 9.95	Andre de Grasse; CAN | 9.96	Justin Gatlin; USA | 9.97	Michael Rodgers; USA | 9.98	Adam Gemili; GBR | 10.03	Ben Youssef Meité; CIV | 10.04
Men's 400m	LaShawn Merritt; USA | 44.79	Baboloki Thebe; BOT | 45.04	Vernon Norwood; USA | 45.05	Tony McQuay; USA | 45.19	Pavel Maslák; CZE | 45.42	Paul Dedewo; USA | 45.79	Matthew Hudson-Smith; GBR | 46.08	Karabo Sibanda; BOT | DNF
Men's 5000m	Mo Farah; GBR | 13:00.70	Yomif Kejelcha; ETH | 13:01.21	Geoffrey Kamworor; KEN | 13:01.35	Joshua Cheptegei; UGA | 13:02.84	Albert Rop; BRN | 13:04.82	Mohammed Ahmed; CAN | 13:08.16	Paul Chelimo; USA | 13:10.11	Andrew Butchart; GBR | 13:11.45
Men's Pole Vault	Sam Kendricks; USA | 5.86 m	Renaud Lavillenie; FRA | 5.81 m	Piotr Lisek; POL | 5.81 m	Armand Duplantis; SWE | 5.71 m	Shawnacy Barber; CAN | 5.71 m	Konstantinos Filippidis; GRE | 5.56 m	Changrui Xue; CHN | 5.56 m	Paweł Wojciechowski; POL | 5.56 m
Men's Triple Jump	Christian Taylor; USA | 18.11 m	Will Claye; USA | 18.05 m	Bin Dong; CHN | 17.27 m	Alexis Copello; AZE | 17.17 m	Jhon Murillo; COL | 16.95 m	Jean-Marc Pontvianne; FRA | 16.82 m	Max Heß; GER | 16.59 m	Troy Doris; GUY | 16.48 m
Men's Shot Put	Ryan Crouser; USA | 22.43 m	Tom Walsh; NZL | 21.71 m	Joe Kovacs; USA | 21.44 m	Darrell Hill; USA | 21.20 m	David Storl; GER | 20.63 m	Franck Elemba; CGO | 20.56 m	Konrad Bukowiecki; POL | 20.29 m	Kurt Roberts; USA | 19.80 m
Women's 200m (+1.5 m/s)	Tori Bowie; USA | 21.77	Shaunae Miller-Uibo; BAH | 21.91	Elaine Thompson-Herah; JAM | 21.98	Dafne Schippers; NED | 22.30	Allyson Felix; USA | 22.33	Marie-Josée Ta Lou; CIV | 22.37	Jenna Prandini; USA | 22.54	Ivet Lalova-Collio; BUL | 22.88
Women's 800m	Caster Semenya; RSA | 1:57.78	Margaret Nyairera Wambui; KEN | 1:57.88	Francine Niyonsaba; BDI | 1:59.10	Habitam Alemu; ETH | 1:59.19	Selina Rutz-Büchel; SUI | 1:59.46	Melissa Bishop-Nriagu; CAN | 1:59.52	Joanna Jóźwik; POL | 2:00.77	Lynsey Sharp; GBR | 2:01.23
Women's 100mH (+0.8 m/s)	Jasmin Stowers; USA | 12.59	Queen Claye; USA | 12.64	Dawn Harper-Nelson; USA | 12.66	Christina Clemons; USA | 12.66	Sharika Nelvis; USA | 12.68	Kristi Castlin; USA | 12.82	Nia Ali; USA | 12.90	Alina Talay; BLR | 12.97
Women's 400mH	Ashley Spencer; USA | 53.38	Shamier Little; USA | 53.44	Georganne Moline; USA | 54.09	Zuzana Hejnová; CZE | 54.50	Dalilah Muhammad; USA | 54.53	Sara Slott Petersen; DEN | 54.85	Kori Carter; USA | 54.98	Janieve Russell; JAM | 56.21
Women's High Jump	Mariya Lasitskene; ANA | 2.03 m	Kamila Lićwinko; POL | 1.95 m	Vashti Cunningham; USA | 1.95 m	Ruth Beitia; ESP | 1.92 m	Mirela Demireva; BUL | 1.88 m	Levern Spencer; LCA | 1.88 m	Chaunte Lowe; USA | 1.79 m	Airinė Palšytė; LTU | NH
Women's Long Jump	Brittney Reese; USA | 7.01 m	Tianna Madison; USA | 6.83 m	Lorraine Ugen; GBR | 6.78 m	Darya Klishina; ANA | 6.70 m	Shara Proctor; GBR | 6.63 m	Blessing Okagbare; NGR | 6.52 m	Christabel Nettey; CAN | 6.33 m	
Women's Javelin Throw	Tatsiana Khaladovich; BLR | 66.30 m	Liu Shiying; CHN | 65.21 m	Sara Kolak; CRO | 64.64 m	Barbora Špotáková; CZE | 63.30 m	Kathryn Mitchell; AUS | 62.87 m	Madara Palameika; LAT | 62.14 m	Kara Winger; USA | 61.66 m	Katharina Molitor; GER | 60.91 m

Rome
Event	1st +8 pts	2nd +7 pts	3rd +6 pts	4th +5 pts	5th +4 pts	6th +3 pts	7th +2 pts	8th +1 pts
Men's 200m (+0.6 m/s)	Andre de Grasse; CAN | 20.01	Christophe Lemaitre; FRA | 20.29	Ameer Webb; USA | 20.33	Filippo Tortu; ITA | 20.34	Aaron Brown; CAN | 20.43	Brendon Rodney; CAN | 20.61	Alonso Edward; PAN | 20.74	Churandy Martina; NED | 20.74
Men's 800m	Adam Kszczot; POL | 1:45.96	Kipyegon Bett; KEN | 1:46.00	Donavan Brazier; USA | 1:46.08	Elijah Motonei Manangoi; KEN | 1:46.22	Marcin Lewandowski; POL | 1:46.51	Brandon McBride; CAN | 1:46.69	Alfred Kipketer; KEN | 1:46.85	Nicholas Kiplangat Kipkoech; KEN | 1:47.09
Men's 110mH (-0.3 m/s)	Aries Merritt; USA | 13.13	Orlando Ortega; ESP | 13.17	Sergey Shubenkov; ANA | 13.21	Andrew Pozzi; GBR | 13.24	Milan Trajkovic; CYP | 13.39	David Oliver; USA | 13.46	Johnathan Cabral; CAN | 13.60	Lorenzo Perini; ITA | 13.65
Men's 3000mSC	Conseslus Kipruto; KEN | 8:04.63	Soufiane el Bakkali; MAR | 8:05.17	Jairus Kipchoge Birech; KEN | 8:07.84	Amos Kirui; KEN | 8:08.37	Yemane Haileselassie; ERI | 8:11.22	Hillary Bor; USA | 8:11.82	Barnabas Kipyego; KEN | 8:14.13	Andrew Bayer; USA | 8:14.46
Men's Javelin Throw	Thomas Röhler; GER | 90.06 m	Johannes Vetter; GER | 88.15 m	Keshorn Walcott; TTO | 86.61 m	Jakub Vadlejch; CZE | 86.37 m	Tero Pitkämäki; FIN | 83.84 m	Magnus Kirt; EST | 83.70 m	Julius Yego; KEN | 82.19 m	Andreas Hofmann; GER | 79.65 m
Women's 100m (+0.5 m/s)	Dafne Schippers; NED | 10.99	Marie-Josée Ta Lou; CIV | 11.03	Michelle-Lee Ahye; TTO | 11.07	Tianna Madison; USA | 11.26	Christania Williams; JAM | 11.32	Desiree Henry; GBR | 11.32	Gina Lückenkemper; GER | 11.39	Mujinga Kambundji; SUI | 11.40
Women's 400m	Natasha Hastings; USA | 50.52	Novlene Williams-Mills; JAM | 51.04	Olha Zemlyak; UKR | DQ	Floria Guei; FRA | 51.51	Stephenie Ann McPherson; JAM | 51.52	Lydia Jele; BOT | 51.53	Lea Sprunger; SUI | 51.56	Justyna Święty-Ersetic; POL | 51.81
Women's 1500m	Sifan Hassan; NED | 3:56.22	Winny Chebet; KEN | 3:59.16	Konstanze Klosterhalfen; GER | 3:59.30	Meraf Bahta; SWE | 4:00.59	Gudaf Tsegay; ETH | 4:01.42	Angelika Cichocka; POL | 4:01.84	Besu Sado; ETH | 4:03.16	Maureen Koster; NED | 4:03.77
Women's 5000m	Hellen Obiri; KEN | 14:18.37	Agnes Jebet Tirop; KEN | 14:33.09	Letesenbet Gidey; ETH | 14:33.32	Yasemin Can; TUR | 14:36.82	Etenesh Diro; ETH | 14:40.29	Genzebe Dibaba; ETH | 14:41.55	Margaret Chelimo Kipkemboi; KEN | 14:43.89	Irine Chepet Cheptai; KEN | 14:47.11
Women's High Jump	Mariya Lasitskene; ANA | 2.00 m	Kamila Lićwinko; POL | 1.96 m	Yuliia Levchenko; UKR | 1.94 m	Alessia Trost; ITA | 1.91 m	Morgan Lake; GBR | 1.91 m	Alyxandria Treasure; CAN | 1.88 m	Mirela Demireva; BUL | 1.88 m	Marie-Laurence Jungfleisch; GER | 1.88 m
Women's Pole Vault	Aikaterini Stefanidi; GRE | 4.85 m	Yarisley Silva; CUB | 4.75 m	Eliza McCartney; NZL | 4.75 m	Anzhelika Sidorova; ANA | 4.65 m	Lisa Ryzih; GER | 4.65 m	Sandi Morris; USA | 4.55 m	Maryna Kylypko; UKR | 4.40 m	Holly Bradshaw; GBR | 4.40 m
Women's Triple Jump	Yulimar Rojas; VEN | 14.84 m	Caterine Ibarguen; COL | 14.78 m	Olga Rypakova; KAZ | 14.64 m	Patrícia Mamona; POR | 14.42 m	Kimberly Williams; JAM | 14.21 m	Liadagmis Povea; CUB | 14.15 m	Dariya Derkach; ITA | 14.04 m	Kristin Gierisch; GER | 13.82 m
Women's Shot Put	Lijiao Gong; CHN | 19.56 m	Daniella Hill; USA | 18.95 m	Michelle Carter; USA | 18.86 m	Anita Márton; HUN | 18.55 m	Aliona Dubitskaya; BLR | 18.43 m	Yuliya Leantsiuk; BLR | 17.93 m	Felisha Johnson; USA | 17.68 m	Brittany Crew; CAN | 17.51 m

Oslo
Event	1st +8 pts	2nd +7 pts	3rd +6 pts	4th +5 pts	5th +4 pts	6th +3 pts	7th +2 pts	8th +1 pts
Men's 100m (+0.2 m/s)	Andre de Grasse; CAN | 10.01	Chijindu Ujah; GBR | 10.02	Ben Youssef Meité; CIV | 10.03	Adam Gemili; GBR | 10.13	Aaron Brown; CAN | 10.15	Churandy Martina; NED | 10.19	Reece Prescod; GBR | 10.20	Jimmy Vicaut; FRA | 10.68
Men's 400m	Baboloki Thebe; BOT | 44.95	Matthew Hudson-Smith; GBR | 45.16	Pavel Maslák; CZE | 45.52	Kévin Borlée; BEL | 45.53	Rafał Omelko; POL | 45.83	Pieter Conradie; RSA | 46.16	Jonathan Borlée; BEL | 46.18	Mauritz Kåshagen; NOR | 47.16
Men's 1500m	Jake Wightman; GBR | 3:34.17	Elijah Motonei Manangoi; KEN | 3:34.30	Marcin Lewandowski; POL | 3:34.60	Filip Ingebrigtsen; NOR | 3:36.74	David Torrence; PER | 3:37.19	Charlie da'Vall Grice; GBR | 3:37.78	Silas Kiplagat; KEN | 3:37.81	Jakub Holuša; CZE | 3:38.19
Men's 400mH	Karsten Warholm; NOR | 48.25	Yasmani Copello; TUR | 48.44	Thomas Barr; IRL | 48.95	Mamadou Kasse Hann; FRA | 48.97	Rasmus Mägi; EST | 49.10	Kariem Hussein; SUI | 49.37	LJ van Zyl; RSA | 49.89	Kerron Clement; USA | 50.52
Men's High Jump	Mutaz Essa Barshim; QAT | 2.38 m	Bohdan Bondarenko; UKR | 2.29 m	Derek Drouin; CAN | 2.25 m	Pavel Seliverstau; BLR | 2.25 m	Michael Mason; CAN | 2.25 m	Donald Thomas; BAH | 2.25 m	Robbie Grabarz; GBR | 2.25 m	Zhang Guowei; CHN | 2.20 m
Men's Discus Throw	Daniel Ståhl; SWE | 68.06 m	Fedrick Dacres; JAM | 67.10 m	Philip Milanov; BEL | 66.39 m	Andrius Gudžius; LTU | 65.90 m	Robert Harting; GER | 65.11 m	Christoph Harting; GER | 64.13 m	Piotr Małachowski; POL | 63.70 m	Sven Martin Skagestad; NOR | 63.21 m
Women's 200m (+1.4 m/s)	Dafne Schippers; NED | 22.31	Murielle Ahouré-Demps; CIV | 22.74	Simone Facey; JAM | 22.77	Gina Lückenkemper; GER | 23.04	Bianca Williams; GBR | 23.38	Ella Nelson; AUS | 23.42	Nadine Gonska; GER | 23.48	Ivet Lalova-Collio; BUL | DQ
Women's 800m	Caster Semenya; RSA | 1:57.59	Francine Niyonsaba; BDI | 1:58.18	Margaret Nyairera Wambui; KEN | 1:59.17	Lovisa Lindh; SWE | 1:59.23	Melissa Bishop-Nriagu; CAN | 1:59.89	Aníta Hinriksdóttir; ISL | 2:00.05	Rose Mary Almanza; CUB | 2:00.34	Lynsey Sharp; GBR | 2:00.41
Women's 100mH (+0.8 m/s)	Pamela Dutkiewicz-Emmerich; GER | 12.73	Kristi Castlin; USA | 12.75	Isabelle Pedersen; NOR | 12.75	Alina Talay; BLR | 12.90	Tiffany Porter; GBR | 12.93	Anne Zagré; BEL | 12.98	Nadine Hildebrand; GER | 13.01	Raven Clay; USA | 13.07
Women's 3000mSC	Norah Jeruto; KEN | 9:17.27	Sofia Assefa; ETH | 9:17.34	Fabienne Schlumpf; SUI | 9:21.65	Purity Kirui; KEN | 9:25.82	Luiza Gega; ALB | 9:26.05	Daisy Jepkemei; KEN | 9:28.88	Joanne Kipkemoi; KEN | 9:31.84	Tigest Getent Mekonen; BRN | 9:33.10
Women's Pole Vault	Yarisley Silva; CUB | 4.81 m	Anzhelika Sidorova; ANA | 4.75 m	Lisa Ryzih; GER | 4.65 m	Angelica Bengtsson; SWE | 4.55 m	Alysha Newman; CAN | 4.55 m	Mary Saxer; USA | 4.40 m	Eliza McCartney; NZL | NH	Nicole Büchler; SUI | NH
Women's Long Jump	Tianna Madison; USA | 6.79 m	Darya Klishina; ANA | 6.75 m	Claudia Salman-Rath; GER | 6.63 m	Shara Proctor; GBR | 6.53 m	Melanie Bauschke; GER | 6.52 m	Lorraine Ugen; GBR | 6.50 m	Blessing Okagbare; NGR | 6.48 m	Nadia Assa; NOR | 6.38 m
Women's Discus Throw	Sandra Perković; CRO | 66.79 m	Yaimé Pérez; CUB | 66.24 m	Denia Caballero; CUB | 63.29 m	Nadine Müller; GER | 62.90 m	Melina Robert-Michon; FRA | 59.88 m	Julia Harting; GER | 59.02 m		

Stockholm
Event	1st +8 pts	2nd +7 pts	3rd +6 pts	4th +5 pts	5th +4 pts	6th +3 pts	7th +2 pts	8th +1 pts
Men's 100m (+4.8 m/s)	Andre de Grasse; CAN | 9.69	Ben Youssef Meité; CIV | 9.84	Ryan Shields; JAM | 9.89	Yunier Pérez; CUB | 9.92	Julian Reus; GER | 9.99	Churandy Martina; NED | 10.00	Alex Wilson; SUI | 10.08	Austin Hamilton; SWE | 10.16
Men's 400m	Steven Gardiner; BAH | 44.58	Baboloki Thebe; BOT | 44.99	Kévin Borlée; BEL | 45.47	Luka Janežič; SLO | 45.56	Rafał Omelko; POL | 45.76	Rabah Yousif; GBR | 46.06	Onkabetse Nkobolo; BOT | 46.24	Pieter Conradie; RSA | 47.22
Men's 1500m	Timothy Cheruiyot; KEN | 3:30.77	Sadik Mikhou; BRN | DQ	Aman Wote; ETH | 3:31.63	Asbel Kiprop; KEN | 3:33.17	Jakub Holuša; CZE | 3:34.26	Ryan Gregson; AUS | 3:34.37	Marcin Lewandowski; POL | 3:34.50	David Torrence; PER | 3:34.67
Men's 110mH (+3.5 m/s)	Orlando Ortega; ESP | 13.09	Sergey Shubenkov; ANA | 13.10	Shane Brathwaite; BAR | 13.25	Aurel Manga; FRA | 13.30	Damian Czykier; POL | 13.36	Andrew Pozzi; GBR | DQ	Antonio Alkana; RSA | DQ	
Men's 400mH	Karsten Warholm; NOR | 48.82	Rasmus Mägi; EST | 49.16	Yasmani Copello; TUR | 49.18	Jack Green; GBR | 49.29	Mamadou Kasse Hann; FRA | 49.72	Bershawn Jackson; USA | 50.28	Isak Andersson; SWE | 50.50	LJ van Zyl; RSA | 51.42
Men's 3000mSC	Soufiane el Bakkali; MAR | 8:15.01	Yemane Haileselassie; ERI | 8:18.29	Nicholas Kiptonui Bett; KEN | 8:21.98	Chala Beyo; ETH | 8:22.65	Sebastián Martos; ESP | 8:22.85	Lawrence Kemboi Kipsang; KEN | 8:23.93	Clement Kimutai Kemboi; KEN | 8:23.98	Krystian Zalewski; POL | 8:28.50
Men's Long Jump	Luvo Manyonga; RSA | 8.36 m	Ruswahl Samaai; RSA | 8.29 m	Radek Juška; CZE | 8.09 m	Michel Tornéus; SWE | 8.06 m	Emiliano Lasa; URU | 8.00 m	Godfrey Khotso Mokoena; RSA | 7.98 m	Andreas Otterling; SWE | 7.87 m	Fabrice Lapierre; AUS | 7.78 m
Men's Discus Throw	Fedrick Dacres; JAM | 68.36 m	Daniel Ståhl; SWE | 68.13 m	Andrius Gudžius; LTU | 67.29 m	Philip Milanov; BEL | 67.05 m	Robert Harting; GER | 66.20 m	Piotr Małachowski; POL | 64.60 m	Christoph Harting; GER | 61.75 m	Axel Härstedt; SWE | 60.28 m
Women's 200m (+1.1 m/s)	Murielle Ahouré-Demps; CIV | 22.68	Crystal Emmanuel; CAN | 22.69	Rebekka Haase; GER | 22.76	Ivet Lalova-Collio; BUL | 22.82	Estela García; ESP | 23.16	Ella Nelson; AUS | 23.27	Fanny Peltier; FRA | 23.31	Elin Östlund; SWE | 23.82
Women's 800m	Francine Niyonsaba; BDI | 1:59.11	Lovisa Lindh; SWE | 1:59.41	Selina Rutz-Büchel; SUI | 1:59.66	Melissa Bishop-Nriagu; CAN | 1:59.70	Olha Lyakhova; UKR | 1:59.84	Rose Mary Almanza; CUB | 1:59.93	Aníta Hinriksdóttir; ISL | 2:00.06	Lynsey Sharp; GBR | 2:00.19
Women's High Jump	Mariya Lasitskene; ANA | 2.00 m	Kamila Lićwinko; POL | 1.97 m	Sofie Skoog; SWE | 1.94 m	Yuliia Levchenko; UKR | 1.94 m	Oksana Okuneva; UKR | 1.90 m	Erika Kinsey; SWE | 1.90 m	Alessia Trost; ITA | 1.85 m	Mirela Demireva; BUL | 1.85 m
Women's Pole Vault	Nicole Büchler; SUI | 4.65 m	Angelica Bengtsson; SWE | 4.65 m	Robeilys Peinado; VEN | 4.65 m	Anzhelika Sidorova; ANA | 4.55 m	Yarisley Silva; CUB | 4.55 m	Michaela Meijer; SWE | 4.40 m	Lisa Ryzih; GER | 4.40 m	Eliza McCartney; NZL | 4.20 m
Women's Discus Throw	Yaimé Pérez; CUB | 67.92 m	Sandra Perković; CRO | 67.75 m	Nadine Müller; GER | 65.74 m	Melina Robert-Michon; FRA | 61.91 m	Denia Caballero; CUB | 60.48 m	Julia Harting; GER | 58.90 m		

Paris
Event	1st +8 pts	2nd +7 pts	3rd +6 pts	4th +5 pts	5th +4 pts	6th +3 pts	7th +2 pts	8th +1 pts
Men's 200m (-0.5 m/s)	Ramil Guliyev; TUR | 20.15	Churandy Martina; NED | 20.27	Rasheed Dwyer; JAM | 20.45	Ameer Webb; USA | 20.48	Lykourgos-Stefanos Tsakonas; GRE | 20.51	Dedric Dukes; USA | 20.55	Jeffrey John; FRA | 20.72	Ben Bassaw; FRA | 20.94
Men's 800m	Nijel Amos; BOT | 1:44.24	Kipyegon Bett; KEN | 1:44.36	Ferguson Cheruiyot Rotich; KEN | 1:44.37	Robert Biwott; KEN | 1:45.05	Amel Tuka; BIH | 1:45.40	Job Kinyor; KEN | 1:45.50	Pierre-Ambroise Bosse; FRA | 1:45.71	Thijmen Kupers; NED | 1:46.07
Men's 3000m	Muktar Edris; ETH | 7:32.31	Ronald Kwemoi; KEN | 7:32.88	Yomif Kejelcha; ETH | 7:33.37	Joshua Cheptegei; UGA | 7:34.96	Adel Mechaal; ESP | 7:35.28	Ben True; USA | 7:35.53	Patrick Tiernan; AUS | 7:39.28	Yenew Alamirew; ETH | 7:39.57
Men's 110mH (-0.1 m/s)	Ronald Levy; JAM | 13.05	Andrew Pozzi; GBR | 13.14	Garfield Darien; FRA | 13.15	Sergey Shubenkov; ANA | 13.18	Antonio Alkana; RSA | 13.24	Milan Trajkovic; CYP | 13.30	Omar McLeod; JAM | 13.41	Devon Allen; USA | DQ
Men's High Jump	Mutaz Essa Barshim; QAT | 2.35 m	Bohdan Bondarenko; UKR | 2.32 m	Majd Eddin Ghazal; SYR | 2.32 m	Tihomir Ivanov; BUL | 2.28 m	Andrii Protsenko; UKR | 2.28 m	Robbie Grabarz; GBR | 2.24 m	Michael Mason; CAN | 2.24 m	Takashi Eto; JPN | 2.20 m
Men's Pole Vault	Sam Kendricks; USA | 5.82 m	Renaud Lavillenie; FRA | 5.62 m	Shawnacy Barber; CAN | 5.62 m	Paweł Wojciechowski; POL | 5.62 m	Kévin Ménaldo; FRA | 5.52 m	Axel Chapelle; FRA | 5.52 m	Raphael Holzdeppe; GER | 5.52 m	Jan Kudlička; CZE | 5.52 m
Men's Triple Jump	Christian Taylor; USA | 17.29 m	Will Claye; USA | 17.18 m	Max Heß; GER | 17.07 m	Pedro Pichardo; CUB | 17.05 m	Alexis Copello; AZE | 16.96 m	Nelson Évora; POR | 16.91 m	Jean-Marc Pontvianne; FRA | 16.82 m	Hugues Fabrice Zango; BUR | 16.60 m
Men's Javelin Throw	Johannes Vetter; GER | 88.74 m	Jakub Vadlejch; CZE | 88.02 m	Thomas Röhler; GER | 87.23 m	Tero Pitkämäki; FIN | 85.34 m	Neeraj Chopra; IND | 84.67 m	Magnus Kirt; EST | 83.88 m	Hamish Peacock; AUS | 83.87 m	Andrian Mardare; MDA | 77.93 m
Women's 100m (+0.1 m/s)	Elaine Thompson-Herah; JAM | 10.91	Marie-Josée Ta Lou; CIV | 10.96	Blessing Okagbare; NGR | 11.09	Murielle Ahouré-Demps; CIV | 11.10	Carolle Zahi; FRA | 11.17	Christania Williams; JAM | 11.22	Morolake Akinosun; USA | 11.27	Floriane Gnafoua; FRA | 11.37
Women's 400m	Novlene Williams-Mills; JAM | 51.03	Courtney Okolo; USA | 51.19	Shericka Jackson; JAM | 51.91	Lydia Jele; BOT | 51.96	Floria Guei; FRA | 52.33	Olha Zemlyak; UKR | DQ	Déborah Sananes; FRA | 53.41	Stephenie Ann McPherson; JAM | DNS
Women's 1500m	Sifan Hassan; NED | 3:57.10	Faith Kipyegon; KEN | 3:57.51	Gudaf Tsegay; ETH | 3:59.55	Angelika Cichocka; POL | 4:01.61	Rababe Arafi; MAR | 4:01.81	Winny Chebet; KEN | 4:03.55	Nelly Jepkosgei; BRN | 4:04.64	Judith Kiyeng; KEN | 4:05.54
Women's 3000mSC	Beatrice Chepkoech; KEN | 9:01.69	Hyvin Kiyeng; KEN | 9:06.00	Celliphine Chepteek Chespol; KEN | 9:07.54	Ruth Jebet; BRN | 9:10.95	Emma Coburn; USA | 9:11.08	Etenesh Diro; ETH | 9:13.25	Aisha Praught-Leer; JAM | 9:20.38	Fabienne Schlumpf; SUI | 9:22.01
Women's Shot Put	Lijiao Gong; CHN | 19.14 m	Anita Márton; HUN | 18.48 m	Yuliya Leantsiuk; BLR | 18.28 m	Aliona Dubitskaya; BLR | 18.23 m	Paulina Guba; POL | 17.78 m	Fanny Roos; SWE | 17.68 m	Geisa Arcanjo; BRA | 17.36 m	Melissa Boekelman; NED | 17.22 m

Lausanne
Event	1st +8 pts	2nd +7 pts	3rd +6 pts	4th +5 pts	5th +4 pts	6th +3 pts	7th +2 pts	8th +1 pts
Men's 100m (+0.2 m/s)	Justin Gatlin; USA | 9.96	Ben Youssef Meité; CIV | 9.98	Akani Simbine; RSA | 9.99	Isiah Young; USA | 10.00	James Dasaolu; GBR | 10.12	Henricho Bruintjies; RSA | 10.15	Alex Wilson; SUI | 10.17	Kim Collins; SKN | 10.77
Men's 400m	Wayde van Niekerk; RSA | 43.62	Baboloki Thebe; BOT | 44.02	Isaac Makwala; BOT | 44.08	Vernon Norwood; USA | 44.47	Michael Cherry; USA | 44.66	Tony McQuay; USA | 45.28	Liemarvin Bonevacia; NED | 45.61	Machel Cedenio; TTO | DNF
Men's 1500m	Aman Wote; ETH | 3:32.20	Charles Cheboi Simotwo; KEN | 3:32.59	Silas Kiplagat; KEN | 3:32.96	Vincent Kibet; KEN | 3:33.34	Filip Ingebrigtsen; NOR | 3:34.38	Ayanleh Souleiman; DJI | 3:34.70	Matthew Centrowitz Jr. USA | 3:34.83	Bethwell Birgen; KEN | 3:35.22
Men's 5000m	Muktar Edris; ETH | 12:55.23	Selemon Barega; ETH | 12:55.58	Joshua Cheptegei; UGA | 12:59.83	Yenew Alamirew; ETH | 13:06.81	Birhanu Legese; ETH | 13:26.40	Ben True; USA | 13:28.29	Dawit Wolde; ETH | 13:34.44	Solomon Berihu; ETH | 13:37.63
Men's Pole Vault	Sam Kendricks; USA | 5.93 m	Paweł Wojciechowski; POL | 5.93 m	Renaud Lavillenie; FRA | 5.87 m	Kévin Ménaldo; FRA | 5.73 m	Kurtis Marschall; AUS | 5.73 m	Piotr Lisek; POL | 5.73 m	Armand Duplantis; SWE | 5.73 m	Shawnacy Barber; CAN | 5.63 m
Men's Triple Jump	Pedro Pichardo; CUB | 17.60 m	Christian Taylor; USA | 17.49 m	Will Claye; USA | 17.12 m	Alexis Copello; AZE | 16.98 m	Chris Benard; USA | 16.93 m	Jean-Marc Pontvianne; FRA | 16.84 m	Jhon Murillo; COL | 16.47 m	Bin Dong; CHN | NM
Men's Shot Put	Ryan Crouser; USA | 22.39 m	Tom Walsh; NZL | 21.97 m	Tomáš Staněk; CZE | 21.36 m	Stipe Žunić; CRO | 21.17 m	David Storl; GER | 21.17 m	Konrad Bukowiecki; POL | 21.03 m	Tsanko Arnaudov; POR | 20.80 m	Jacko Gill; NZL | 20.70 m
Women's 200m (-0.5 m/s)	Dafne Schippers; NED | 22.10	Marie-Josée Ta Lou; CIV | 22.16	Kyra Jefferson; USA | 22.34	Jenna Prandini; USA | 22.65	Kimberlyn Duncan; USA | 22.67	Mujinga Kambundji; SUI | 22.82	Bianca Williams; GBR | 22.94	Sarah Atcho; SUI | 23.04
Women's 800m	Francine Niyonsaba; BDI | 1:56.82	Charlene Lipsey; USA | 1:57.38	Eunice Jepkoech Sum; KEN | 1:57.78	Sifan Hassan; NED | 1:58.13	Laura Muir; GBR | 1:58.69	Lovisa Lindh; SWE | 1:58.77	Lynsey Sharp; GBR | 1:58.80	Natalіia Krol; UKR | 1:58.82
Women's 100mH (-0.1 m/s)	Sharika Nelvis; USA | 12.53	Jasmin Stowers; USA | 12.57	Christina Clemons; USA | 12.58	Nia Ali; USA | 12.61	Kristi Castlin; USA | 12.61	Dawn Harper-Nelson; USA | 12.75	Eefje Boons; NED | 12.98	Noemi Zbären; SUI | 15.85
Women's 400mH	Ashley Spencer; USA | 53.90	Lea Sprunger; SUI | 54.29	Eilidh Doyle; GBR | 54.36	Sara Slott Petersen; DEN | 54.49	Zuzana Hejnová; CZE | 54.69	Shamier Little; USA | 55.10	Ristananna Tracey; JAM | 56.23	Dalilah Muhammad; USA | DNF
Women's High Jump	Mariya Lasitskene; ANA | 2.06 m	Kamila Lićwinko; POL | 1.93 m	Sofie Skoog; SWE | 1.93 m	Morgan Lake; GBR | 1.93 m	Alessia Trost; ITA | 1.93 m	Ruth Beitia; ESP | 1.90 m	Mirela Demireva; BUL | 1.87 m	Airinė Palšytė; LTU | DNS
Women's Long Jump	Ivana Vuleta; SRB | 6.79 m	Sha'keela Saunders; USA | 6.68 m	Tianna Madison; USA | 6.65 m	Darya Klishina; ANA | 6.64 m	Lorraine Ugen; GBR | 6.61 m	Laura Strati; ITA | 6.49 m	Concepción Montaner; ESP | 6.27 m	Shara Proctor; GBR | NM
Women's Javelin Throw	Sara Kolak; CRO | 68.43 m	Barbora Špotáková; CZE | 67.40 m	Kathryn Mitchell; AUS | 66.12 m	Kelsey-Lee Barber; AUS | 64.06 m	Tatsiana Khaladovich; BLR | 62.29 m	Sunette Viljoen; RSA | 61.38 m	Madara Palameika; LAT | 60.35 m	Kara Winger; USA | 59.19 m

London
Event	1st +8 pts	2nd +7 pts	3rd +6 pts	4th +5 pts	5th +4 pts	6th +3 pts	7th +2 pts	8th +1 pts
Men's 200m (-0.7 m/s)	Ameer Webb; USA | 20.13	Fred Kerley; USA | 20.24	Isiah Young; USA | 20.24	Nethaneel Mitchell-Blake; GBR | 20.30	Zharnel Hughes; GBR | 20.33	Daniel Talbot; GBR | 20.33	Rasheed Dwyer; JAM | 20.49	Christophe Lemaitre; FRA | 20.50
Men's 800m	Nijel Amos; BOT | 1:43.18	Donavan Brazier; USA | 1:43.95	Asbel Kiprop; KEN | 1:44.43	Erik Sowinski; USA | 1:44.82	Elliot Giles; GBR | 1:44.99	Adam Kszczot; POL | 1:45.21	Jake Wightman; GBR | 1:45.42	Kyle Langford; GBR | 1:45.45
Men's 110mH (0.0 m/s)	Aries Merritt; USA | 13.09	Milan Trajkovic; CYP | 13.25	Shane Brathwaite; BAR | 13.27	Devon Allen; USA | 13.30	Jarret Eaton; USA | 13.34	Aaron Mallett; USA | 13.47	Eddie Lovett; ISV | 13.48	David Omoregie; GBR | 13.70
Men's 400mH	Kerron Clement; USA | 48.02	Kyron McMaster; IVB | 48.12	Yasmani Copello; TUR | 48.24	Michael Stigler; USA | 48.32	Eric Futch; USA | 48.68	Jack Green; GBR | 48.77	Quincy Downing; USA | 48.81	Jacob Paul; GBR | 49.49
Men's Discus Throw	Daniel Ståhl; SWE | 66.73 m	Fedrick Dacres; JAM | 66.66 m	Philip Milanov; BEL | 66.65 m	Robert Urbanek; POL | 64.51 m	Andrius Gudžius; LTU | 64.15 m	Andrew Evans; USA | 63.12 m	Mason Finley; USA | 62.48 m	Lukas Weißhaidinger; AUT | 61.10 m
Women's 100m (-1.4 m/s)	Elaine Thompson-Herah; JAM | 10.94	Dafne Schippers; NED | 10.97	Blessing Okagbare; NGR | 10.99	Morolake Akinosun; USA | 11.02	Michelle-Lee Ahye; TTO | 11.06	Asha Philip; GBR | 11.19	Daryll Neita; GBR | 11.22	Rosângela Santos; BRA | 11.22
Women's 400m	Allyson Felix; USA | 49.65	Courtney Okolo; USA | 50.29	Shamier Little; USA | 50.40	Novlene Williams-Mills; JAM | 50.60	Shericka Jackson; JAM | 50.77	Natasha Hastings; USA | 50.85	Emily Diamond; GBR | 51.67	Floria Guei; FRA | 52.23
Women's Mile	Hellen Obiri; KEN | 4:16.56	Laura Muir; GBR | 4:18.03	Winny Chebet; KEN | 4:19.55	Angelika Cichocka; POL | 4:19.58	Jenny Simpson; USA | 4:19.98	Laura Weightman; GBR | 4:20.88	Ciara Mageean; IRL | 4:22.40	Melissa Courtney-Bryant; GBR | 4:23.15
Women's 100mH (+0.2 m/s)	Kendra Harrison; USA | 12.39	Sally Pearson; AUS | 12.48	Sharika Nelvis; USA | 12.62	Christina Clemons; USA | 12.65	Nia Ali; USA | 12.79	Nadine Visser; NED | 12.86	Isabelle Pedersen; NOR | 13.01	Jasmin Stowers; USA | DNF
Women's High Jump	Mariya Lasitskene; ANA | 2.00 m	Vashti Cunningham; USA | 1.97 m	Erika Kinsey; SWE | 1.94 m	Michaela Hrubá; CZE | 1.94 m	Sofie Skoog; SWE | 1.94 m	Ruth Beitia; ESP | 1.90 m	Morgan Lake; GBR | 1.90 m	Mirela Demireva; BUL | 1.85 m
Women's Pole Vault	Aikaterini Stefanidi; GRE | 4.81 m	Nicole Büchler; SUI | 4.73 m	Michaela Meijer; SWE | 4.65 m	Sandi Morris; USA | 4.65 m	Yarisley Silva; CUB | 4.55 m	Holly Bradshaw; GBR | 4.55 m	Katie Moon; USA | 4.55 m	Mary Saxer; USA | 4.30 m
Women's Long Jump	Tianna Madison; USA | 7.01 m	Ivana Vuleta; SRB | 6.88 m	Brooke Buschkuehl; AUS | 6.79 m	Katarina Johnson-Thompson; GBR | 6.75 m	Christabel Nettey; CAN | 6.63 m	Lorraine Ugen; GBR | 6.59 m	Sha'keela Saunders; USA | 6.58 m	Claudia Salman-Rath; GER | 6.53 m
Women's Javelin Throw	Barbora Špotáková; CZE | 68.26 m	Sara Kolak; CRO | 67.83 m	Martina Ratej; SLO | 64.85 m	Elizabeth Gleadle; CAN | 64.47 m	Kelsey-Lee Barber; AUS | 64.38 m	Kathryn Mitchell; AUS | 63.25 m	Kara Winger; USA | 61.06 m	Madara Palameika; LAT | 60.91 m

Rabat
Event	1st +8 pts	2nd +7 pts	3rd +6 pts	4th +5 pts	5th +4 pts	6th +3 pts	7th +2 pts	8th +1 pts
Men's 200m (+0.4 m/s)	Andre de Grasse; CAN | 20.03	Ameer Webb; USA | 20.18	Zharnel Hughes; GBR | 20.22	Fred Kerley; USA | 20.27	Clarence Munyai; RSA | 20.31	Rasheed Dwyer; JAM | 20.43	Warren Weir; JAM | 20.48	Churandy Martina; NED | 20.84
Men's 800m	Nijel Amos; BOT | 1:43.91	Kipyegon Bett; KEN | 1:44.28	Donavan Brazier; USA | 1:44.62	Brandon McBride; CAN | 1:45.01	Ferguson Cheruiyot Rotich; KEN | 1:45.26	Nicholas Kiplangat Kipkoech; KEN | 1:45.37	Robert Biwott; KEN | 1:45.75	Mostafa Smaili; MAR | 1:45.79
Men's 3000mSC	Soufiane el Bakkali; MAR | 8:05.12	Jairus Kipchoge Birech; KEN | 8:10.91	Amos Kirui; KEN | 8:12.18	Abraham Kibiwot; KEN | 8:16.25	Andrew Bayer; USA | 8:16.73	Ibrahim Ezzaydouni; ESP | 8:18.50	Hailemariyam Amare; ETH | 8:21.76	Altobeli Silva; BRA | 8:23.67
Men's High Jump	Andrii Protsenko; UKR | 2.29 m	Tihomir Ivanov; BUL | 2.27 m	Gianmarco Tamberi; ITA | 2.27 m	Robbie Grabarz; GBR | 2.27 m	Mateusz Przybylko; GER | 2.27 m	Donald Thomas; BAH | 2.27 m	Eure Yañez; VEN | 2.23 m	Bryan McBride; USA | 2.19 m
Men's Pole Vault	Paweł Wojciechowski; POL | 5.85 m	Raphael Holzdeppe; GER | 5.70 m	Piotr Lisek; POL | 5.70 m	Shawnacy Barber; CAN | 5.60 m	Jan Kudlička; CZE | 5.60 m	Germán Chiaraviglio; ARG | 5.50 m	Hendrik Gruber; GER | 5.20 m	Diogo Ferreira; POR | 5.20 m
Men's Long Jump	Ruswahl Samaai; RSA | 8.35 m	Jarrion Lawson; USA | 8.33 m	Yahya Berrabah; MAR | 8.14 m	Fabrice Lapierre; AUS | 7.99 m	Godfrey Khotso Mokoena; RSA | 7.94 m	Emiliano Lasa; URU | 7.91 m	Michael Hartfield; USA | 7.80 m	Michel Tornéus; SWE | 7.66 m
Men's Shot Put	Ryan Crouser; USA | 22.47 m	O'Dayne Richards; JAM | 21.96 m	Ryan Whiting; USA | 21.26 m	Konrad Bukowiecki; POL | 21.12 m	Darrell Hill; USA | 21.12 m	Darlan Romani; BRA | 21.08 m	Damien Birkinhead; AUS | 20.44 m	Franck Elemba; CGO | 20.16 m
Women's 100m (+0.3 m/s)	Elaine Thompson-Herah; JAM | 10.87	Marie-Josée Ta Lou; CIV | 10.90	Michelle-Lee Ahye; TTO | 11.02	Blessing Okagbare; NGR | 11.03	Kelly-Ann Baptiste; TTO | 11.04	Daryll Neita; GBR | 11.16	Jura Levy; JAM | 11.18	Aaliyah Brown; USA | 11.26
Women's 400m	Shaunae Miller-Uibo; BAH | 49.80	Natasha Hastings; USA | 50.86	Quanera Hayes; USA | 51.08	Novlene Williams-Mills; JAM | 51.18	Shericka Jackson; JAM | 51.20	Courtney Okolo; USA | 51.33	Caster Semenya; RSA | 51.53	Olha Zemlyak; UKR | DQ
Women's 1500m	Angelika Cichocka; POL | 4:01.93	Rababe Arafi; MAR | 4:02.19	Brenda Martinez; USA | 4:02.75	Laura Weightman; GBR | 4:03.07	Malika Akkaoui; MAR | 4:03.36	Shannon Rowbury; USA | 4:04.73	Nelly Jepkosgei; BRN | 4:04.93	Zoe Buckman; AUS | 4:04.93
Women's 400mH	Zuzana Hejnová; CZE | 54.22	Janieve Russell; JAM | 54.36	Eilidh Doyle; GBR | 54.92	Lea Sprunger; SUI | 55.22	Wenda Nel; RSA | 55.31	Sara Slott Petersen; DEN | 55.56	Cassandra Tate; USA | 55.70	Ronda Whyte; JAM | 56.00
Women's 3000mSC	Gesa Felicitas Krause; GER | 9:18.87	Norah Jeruto; KEN | 9:20.51	Rosefline Chepngetich; KEN | DQ	Fadwa Sidi Madane; MAR | 9:23.99	Purity Kirui; KEN | 9:25.55	Winfred Mutile Yavi; BRN | 9:27.61	Caroline Tuigong; KEN | 9:39.00	Stephanie Garcia; USA | 9:40.63
Women's Triple Jump	Caterine Ibarguen; COL | 14.51 m	Kimberly Williams; JAM | 14.31 m	Paraskevi Papachristou; GRE | 14.21 m	Olga Rypakova; KAZ | 14.20 m	Gabriela Petrova; BUL | 14.11 m	Patrícia Mamona; POR | 13.94 m	Nubia Soares; BRA | 13.69 m	Andrea Norris; USA | 13.33 m
Women's Javelin Throw	Barbora Špotáková; CZE | 63.73 m	Martina Ratej; SLO | 62.46 m	Tatsiana Khaladovich; BLR | 62.38 m	Elizabeth Gleadle; CAN | 60.43 m	Kara Winger; USA | 59.94 m	Ásdís Hjálmsdóttir; ISL | 59.67 m	Madara Palameika; LAT | 57.80 m	

Monaco
Event	1st +8 pts	2nd +7 pts	3rd +6 pts	4th +5 pts	5th +4 pts	6th +3 pts	7th +2 pts	8th +1 pts
Men's 100m (+0.7 m/s)	Usain Bolt; JAM | 9.95	Isiah Young; USA | 9.98	Akani Simbine; RSA | 10.02	Chijindu Ujah; GBR | 10.02	Bingtian Su; CHN | 10.06	Michael Rodgers; USA | 10.06	Christopher Belcher; USA | 10.12	Yunier Pérez; CUB | 10.20
Men's 400m	Wayde van Niekerk; RSA | 43.73	Isaac Makwala; BOT | 43.84	Baboloki Thebe; BOT | 44.26	Gil Roberts; USA | 44.57	Vernon Norwood; USA | 44.81	Luka Janežič; SLO | 44.84	Tony McQuay; USA | 46.04	Teddy Atine-Venel; FRA | DQ
Men's 1500m	Elijah Motonei Manangoi; KEN | 3:28.80	Timothy Cheruiyot; KEN | 3:29.10	Ronald Kwemoi; KEN | 3:32.34	Filip Ingebrigtsen; NOR | 3:32.48	Homiyu Tesfaye; GER | 3:33.47	Charles Cheboi Simotwo; KEN | 3:33.54	Chris O'Hare; GBR | 3:33.61	Marcin Lewandowski; POL | 3:34.04
Men's 3000mSC	Evan Jager; USA | 8:01.29	Jairus Kipchoge Birech; KEN | 8:07.68	Stanley Kipkoech Kebenei; USA | 8:08.30	Benjamin Kigen; KEN | 8:11.38	Amos Kirui; KEN | 8:15.91	Andrew Bayer; USA | 8:19.27	Hillary Bor; USA | 8:25.88	Abraham Kibiwot; KEN | 8:32.39
Men's Pole Vault	Piotr Lisek; POL | 5.82 m	Jan Kudlička; CZE | 5.72 m	Kévin Ménaldo; FRA | 5.72 m	Axel Chapelle; FRA | 5.72 m	Renaud Lavillenie; FRA | 5.72 m	Kurtis Marschall; AUS | 5.72 m	Shawnacy Barber; CAN | 5.72 m	Valentin Lavillenie; FRA | 5.60 m
Men's Javelin Throw	Thomas Röhler; GER | 89.17 m	Jakub Vadlejch; CZE | 85.43 m	Johannes Vetter; GER | 85.14 m	Ahmed Bader Magour; QAT | 81.61 m	Keshorn Walcott; TTO | 80.15 m	Julius Yego; KEN | 79.36 m	Neeraj Chopra; IND | 78.92 m	Bernhard Seifert; GER | 75.56 m
Women's 200m (-0.2 m/s)	Marie-Josée Ta Lou; CIV | 22.25	Kyra Jefferson; USA | 22.42	Dina Asher-Smith; GBR | 22.89	Kimberlyn Duncan; USA | 23.06	Finette Agyapong; GBR | 23.22	Gloria Hooper; ITA | 23.31	Maroussia Paré; FRA | 23.40	Fanny Peltier; FRA | 23.73
Women's 800m	Caster Semenya; RSA | 1:55.27	Francine Niyonsaba; BDI | 1:55.47	Ajee Wilson; USA | 1:55.61	Sifan Hassan; NED | 1:56.81	Melissa Bishop-Nriagu; CAN | 1:57.01	Lynsey Sharp; GBR | 1:58.01	Brenda Martinez; USA | 1:58.43	Charlene Lipsey; USA | 2:01.09
Women's 3000m	Hellen Obiri; KEN | 8:23.14	Beatrice Chepkoech; KEN | 8:28.66	Laura Muir; GBR | 8:30.64	Eilish McColgan; GBR | 8:31.39	Lilian Kasait Rengeruk; KEN | 8:32.73	Shannon Rowbury; USA | 8:33.38	Agnes Jebet Tirop; KEN | 8:35.37	Shelby Houlihan; USA | 8:37.40
Women's 100mH (-0.2 m/s)	Kendra Harrison; USA | 12.51	Sharika Nelvis; USA | 12.52	Danielle Williams; JAM | 12.58	Nia Ali; USA | 12.68	Sally Pearson; AUS | 12.68	Jasmin Stowers; USA | 12.75	Pamela Dutkiewicz-Emmerich; GER | 12.82	Isabelle Pedersen; NOR | 13.03
Women's High Jump	Mariya Lasitskene; ANA | 2.05 m	Yuliia Levchenko; UKR | 1.97 m	Vashti Cunningham; USA | 1.97 m	Alessia Trost; ITA | 1.85 m	Maruša Černjul; SLO | 1.85 m	Erika Kinsey; SWE | 1.85 m	Oksana Okuneva; UKR | 1.85 m	Inika McPherson; USA | 1.85 m
Women's Triple Jump	Caterine Ibarguen; COL | 14.86 m	Yulimar Rojas; VEN | 14.83 m	Kimberly Williams; JAM | 14.54 m	Patrícia Mamona; POR | 14.18 m	Elena Andreea Taloș; ROU | 14.16 m	Olga Rypakova; KAZ | 14.12 m	Jeanine Assani Issouf; FRA | 13.82 m	Rouguy Diallo; FRA | 13.76 m

Birmingham
Event	1st +8 pts	2nd +7 pts	3rd +6 pts	4th +5 pts	5th +4 pts	6th +3 pts	7th +2 pts	8th +1 pts
Men's 200m (-0.1 m/s)	Ramil Guliyev; TUR | 20.17	Ameer Webb; USA | 20.26	Aaron Brown; CAN | 20.30	Isaac Makwala; BOT | 20.41	Nethaneel Mitchell-Blake; GBR | 20.46	Daniel Talbot; GBR | 20.47	Christophe Lemaitre; FRA | 20.53	Isiah Young; USA | 20.55
Men's 800m	Nijel Amos; BOT | 1:44.50	Adam Kszczot; POL | 1:45.28	Marcin Lewandowski; POL | 1:45.33	Brandon McBride; CAN | 1:45.39	Elliot Giles; GBR | 1:45.44	Kyle Langford; GBR | 1:45.69	Asbel Kiprop; KEN | 1:46.05	Guy Learmonth; GBR | 1:46.28
Men's 110mH (-0.6 m/s)	Aries Merritt; USA | 13.29	Sergey Shubenkov; ANA | 13.31	Devon Allen; USA | 13.40	Balázs Baji; HUN | 13.47	Orlando Ortega; ESP | 13.48	Andrew Pozzi; GBR | 13.53	David King; GBR | 13.65	Shane Brathwaite; BAR | DQ
Men's High Jump	Mutaz Essa Barshim; QAT | 2.40 m	Majd Eddin Ghazal; SYR | 2.31 m	Tom Gale; GBR | 2.24 m	Luis Castro Rivera; PUR | 2.24 m	Mateusz Przybylko; GER | 2.24 m	Sylwester Bednarek; POL | 2.20 m	Donald Thomas; BAH | 2.20 m	Michael Mason; CAN | 2.20 m
Men's Long Jump	Jarrion Lawson; USA | 8.19 m	Ruswahl Samaai; RSA | 8.03 m	Michael Hartfield; USA | 8.02 m	Michel Tornéus; SWE | 7.98 m	Maykel Massó; CUB | 7.81 m	Dan Bramble; GBR | 7.72 m	Emiliano Lasa; URU | 7.72 m	Godfrey Khotso Mokoena; RSA | 7.70 m
Men's Shot Put	Tom Walsh; NZL | 21.83 m	Ryan Crouser; USA | 21.55 m	Tomáš Staněk; CZE | 21.16 m	David Storl; GER | 21.08 m	Michał Haratyk; POL | 21.01 m	Darrell Hill; USA | 20.75 m	Joe Kovacs; USA | 20.52 m	Stipe Žunić; CRO | 20.29 m
Women's 100m (-1.2 m/s)	Elaine Thompson-Herah; JAM | 10.93	Marie-Josée Ta Lou; CIV | 10.97	Jura Levy; JAM | 11.08	Blessing Okagbare; NGR | 11.21	Dina Asher-Smith; GBR | 11.21	Dafne Schippers; NED | 11.22	Morolake Akinosun; USA | 11.24	Shaunae Miller-Uibo; BAH | 11.37
Women's 400m	Salwa Eid Naser; BRN | 50.59	Allyson Felix; USA | 50.63	Courtney Okolo; USA | 50.66	Phyllis Francis; USA | 51.18	Novlene Williams-Mills; JAM | 51.62	Shericka Jackson; JAM | 52.08	Chrisann Gordon-Powell; JAM | 52.08	Zoey Clark; GBR | 52.87
Women's 1500m	Dawit Seyaum; ETH | 4:01.36	Winny Chebet; KEN | 4:02.24	Rababe Arafi; MAR | 4:02.95	Gudaf Tsegay; ETH | 4:03.00	Meraf Bahta; SWE | 4:03.04	Angelika Cichocka; POL | 4:03.18	Jenny Simpson; USA | 4:03.71	Laura Weightman; GBR | 4:05.81
Women's 3000m	Sifan Hassan; NED | 8:28.90	Konstanze Klosterhalfen; GER | 8:29.89	Margaret Chelimo Kipkemboi; KEN | 8:30.11	Hellen Obiri; KEN | 8:30.21	Eilish McColgan; GBR | 8:31.00	Lilian Kasait Rengeruk; KEN | 8:33.79	Susan Krumins; NED | 8:34.41	Agnes Jebet Tirop; KEN | 8:35.23
Women's 400mH	Zuzana Hejnová; CZE | 54.18	Dalilah Muhammad; USA | 54.20	Janieve Russell; JAM | 54.67	Eilidh Doyle; GBR | 54.89	Sara Slott Petersen; DEN | 55.28	Shamier Little; USA | 57.42		
Women's Pole Vault	Aikaterini Stefanidi; GRE | 4.75 m	Holly Bradshaw; GBR | 4.61 m	Michaela Meijer; SWE | 4.61 m	Sandi Morris; USA | 4.61 m	Yarisley Silva; CUB | 4.61 m	Katie Moon; USA | 4.51 m	Robeilys Peinado; VEN | 4.51 m	Alysha Newman; CAN | 4.51 m
Women's Triple Jump	Caterine Ibarguen; COL | 14.51 m	Kimberly Williams; JAM | 14.44 m	Olga Rypakova; KAZ | 14.29 m	Hanna Minenko; ISR | 14.20 m	Anna Jagaciak; POL | 14.02 m	Shanieka Ricketts; JAM | 14.00 m	Yulimar Rojas; VEN | 13.94 m	Patrícia Mamona; POR | 13.79 m
Women's Discus Throw	Sandra Perković; CRO | 67.51 m	Denia Caballero; CUB | 65.24 m	Yaimé Pérez; CUB | 65.11 m	Dani Stevens; AUS | 64.75 m	Whitney Ashley; USA | 62.21 m	Melina Robert-Michon; FRA | 62.17 m	Nadine Müller; GER | 61.47 m	Gia Lewis-Smallwood; USA | 56.43 m

Zurich
Event	1st ⠀	2nd ⠀	3rd ⠀	4th ⠀	5th ⠀	6th ⠀	7th ⠀	8th ⠀
Men's 100m (0.0 m/s)	Chijindu Ujah; GBR | 9.97	Ben Youssef Meité; CIV | 9.97	Ronnie Baker; USA | 10.01	Justin Gatlin; USA | 10.04	Isiah Young; USA | 10.10	Akani Simbine; RSA | 10.10	Asafa Powell; JAM | 10.11	Adam Gemili; GBR | 10.13
Men's 400m	Isaac Makwala; BOT | 43.95	Gil Roberts; USA | 44.54	Vernon Norwood; USA | 45.01	Pavel Maslák; CZE | 45.67	Kévin Borlée; BEL | 45.77	Liemarvin Bonevacia; NED | 46.31	Pieter Conradie; RSA | 46.45	Steven Gardiner; BAH | DNF
Men's 1500m	Timothy Cheruiyot; KEN | 3:33.93	Silas Kiplagat; KEN | 3:34.26	Elijah Motonei Manangoi; KEN | 3:34.65	Asbel Kiprop; KEN | 3:34.77	Charles Cheboi Simotwo; KEN | 3:34.93	Vincent Kibet; KEN | 3:34.96	Jake Wightman; GBR | 3:35.25	Jakub Holuša; CZE | 3:35.81
Men's 5000m	Mo Farah; GBR | 13:06.05	Muktar Edris; ETH | 13:06.09	Yomif Kejelcha; ETH | 13:06.18	Selemon Barega; ETH | 13:07.35	Mohammed Ahmed; CAN | 13:10.26	Yenew Alamirew; ETH | 13:13.08	Albert Rop; BRN | 13:14.31	Ben True; USA | 13:17.62
Men's 400mH	Kyron McMaster; IVB | 48.07	Karsten Warholm; NOR | 48.22	Kariem Hussein; SUI | 48.45	Kerron Clement; USA | 49.20	Yasmani Copello; TUR | 49.23	Jack Green; GBR | 49.41	LJ van Zyl; RSA | 49.92	Bershawn Jackson; USA | 50.02
Men's High Jump	Mutaz Essa Barshim; QAT | 2.36 m	Majd Eddin Ghazal; SYR | 2.31 m	Bohdan Bondarenko; UKR | 2.31 m	Robbie Grabarz; GBR | 2.24 m	Michael Mason; CAN | 2.24 m	Andrii Protsenko; UKR | 2.24 m	Sylwester Bednarek; POL | 2.20 m	Tom Gale; GBR | 2.20 m
Men's Pole Vault	Sam Kendricks; USA | 5.87 m	Paweł Wojciechowski; POL | 5.80 m	Piotr Lisek; POL | 5.80 m	Kurtis Marschall; AUS | 5.73 m	Shawnacy Barber; CAN | 5.63 m	Kévin Ménaldo; FRA | 5.63 m	Konstantinos Filippidis; GRE | 5.48 m	Dominik Alberto; SUI | 5.48 m
Men's Long Jump	Luvo Manyonga; RSA | 8.49 m	Ruswahl Samaai; RSA | 8.31 m	Jarrion Lawson; USA | 8.12 m	Michel Tornéus; SWE | 8.09 m	Fabrice Lapierre; AUS | 7.94 m	Emiliano Lasa; URU | 7.79 m	Michael Hartfield; USA | 7.67 m	Benjamin Gföhler; SUI | 7.49 m
Men's Javelin Throw	Jakub Vadlejch; CZE | 88.50 m	Thomas Röhler; GER | 86.59 m	Tero Pitkämäki; FIN | 86.57 m	Johannes Vetter; GER | 86.15 m	Keshorn Walcott; TTO | 85.11 m	Magnus Kirt; EST | 84.73 m	Neeraj Chopra; IND | 83.80 m	Ahmed Bader Magour; QAT | 83.73 m
Women's 200m (+0.1 m/s)	Shaunae Miller-Uibo; BAH | 21.88	Elaine Thompson-Herah; JAM | 22.00	Marie-Josée Ta Lou; CIV | 22.09	Dafne Schippers; NED | 22.36	Kyra Jefferson; USA | 22.61	Mujinga Kambundji; SUI | 22.71	Simone Facey; JAM | 22.80	Crystal Emmanuel; CAN | 23.94
Women's 800m	Caster Semenya; RSA | 1:55.84	Francine Niyonsaba; BDI | 1:56.71	Margaret Nyairera Wambui; KEN | 1:56.87	Habitam Alemu; ETH | 1:57.05	Sifan Hassan; NED | 1:57.12	Charlene Lipsey; USA | 1:57.99	Melissa Bishop-Nriagu; CAN | 1:58.30	Selina Rutz-Büchel; SUI | 1:59.83
Women's 100mH (-0.3 m/s)	Sally Pearson; AUS | 12.55	Sharika Nelvis; USA | 12.55	Christina Clemons; USA | 12.67	Danielle Williams; JAM | 12.73	Alina Talay; BLR | 12.80	Dawn Harper-Nelson; USA | 12.93	Jasmin Stowers; USA | 12.95	Kristi Castlin; USA | 13.03
Women's 3000mSC	Ruth Jebet; BRN | 8:55.29	Beatrice Chepkoech; KEN | 8:59.84	Norah Jeruto; KEN | 9:05.31	Emma Coburn; USA | 9:14.81	Hyvin Kiyeng; KEN | 9:14.93	Gesa Felicitas Krause; GER | 9:15.85	Sofia Assefa; ETH | 9:16.45	Celliphine Chepteek Chespol; KEN | 9:17.56
Women's Triple Jump	Olga Rypakova; KAZ | 14.55 m	Yulimar Rojas; VEN | 14.52 m	Caterine Ibarguen; COL | 14.48 m	Kimberly Williams; JAM | 14.41 m	Hanna Minenko; ISR | 13.99 m	Patrícia Mamona; POR | 13.85 m	Anna Jagaciak; POL | 13.79 m	Elena Andreea Taloș; ROU | 13.35 m
Women's Shot Put	Lijiao Gong; CHN | 19.60 m	Anita Márton; HUN | 18.54 m	Yuliya Leantsiuk; BLR | 18.47 m	Michelle Carter; USA | 18.27 m	Daniella Hill; USA | 18.20 m	Aliona Dubitskaya; BLR | 18.02 m	Cleopatra Borel; TTO | 17.85 m	Brittany Smith; USA | 16.13 m
Women's Javelin Throw	Barbora Špotáková; CZE | 65.54 m	Kelsey-Lee Barber; AUS | 64.53 m	Sara Kolak; CRO | 64.47 m	Tatsiana Khaladovich; BLR | 62.89 m	Martina Ratej; SLO | 62.77 m	Madara Palameika; LAT | 62.60 m	Kara Winger; USA | 62.01 m	Elizabeth Gleadle; CAN | 59.06 m

Brussels
Event	1st ⠀	2nd ⠀	3rd ⠀	4th ⠀	5th ⠀	6th ⠀	7th ⠀	8th ⠀
Men's 200m (+0.9 m/s)	Noah Lyles; USA | 20.00	Ameer Webb; USA | 20.01	Ramil Guliyev; TUR | 20.02	Aaron Brown; CAN | 20.17	Christophe Lemaitre; FRA | 20.21	Zharnel Hughes; GBR | 20.27	Nethaneel Mitchell-Blake; GBR | 20.33	Rasheed Dwyer; JAM | 20.67
Men's 800m	Nijel Amos; BOT | 1:44.53	Marcin Lewandowski; POL | 1:44.77	Adam Kszczot; POL | 1:44.84	Kipyegon Bett; KEN | 1:45.21	Ferguson Cheruiyot Rotich; KEN | 1:45.25	Alfred Kipketer; KEN | 1:46.27	Elliot Giles; GBR | 1:47.03	Asbel Kiprop; KEN | 1:49.85
Men's 110mH (+0.5 m/s)	Sergey Shubenkov; ANA | 13.14	Orlando Ortega; ESP | 13.17	Aries Merritt; USA | 13.20	Devon Allen; USA | 13.24	Ronald Levy; JAM | 13.41	Garfield Darien; FRA | 13.42	Milan Trajkovic; CYP | 13.47	Shane Brathwaite; BAR | 13.49
Men's 3000mSC	Conseslus Kipruto; KEN | 8:04.73	Soufiane el Bakkali; MAR | 8:04.83	Evan Jager; USA | 8:11.71	Stanley Kipkoech Kebenei; USA | 8:11.93	Nicholas Kiptonui Bett; KEN | 8:12.20	Benjamin Kigen; KEN | 8:13.06	Amos Kirui; KEN | 8:18.32	Yemane Haileselassie; ERI | 8:19.19
Men's Triple Jump	Christian Taylor; USA | 17.49 m	Will Claye; USA | 17.35 m	Pedro Pichardo; CUB | 17.32 m	Troy Doris; GUY | 16.64 m	Alexis Copello; AZE | 16.55 m	Chris Benard; USA | 16.37 m	Jean-Marc Pontvianne; FRA | 16.36 m	Omar Craddock; USA | 15.89 m
Men's Shot Put	Darrell Hill; USA | 22.44 m	Ryan Crouser; USA | 22.37 m	Joe Kovacs; USA | 21.62 m	David Storl; GER | 21.47 m	Tomáš Staněk; CZE | 21.39 m	Tom Walsh; NZL | 21.38 m	O'Dayne Richards; JAM | 21.07 m	Konrad Bukowiecki; POL | 20.54 m
Men's Discus Throw	Andrius Gudžius; LTU | 68.16 m	Fedrick Dacres; JAM | 66.31 m	Piotr Małachowski; POL | 65.73 m	Philip Milanov; BEL | 64.76 m	Christoph Harting; GER | 64.55 m	Robert Urbanek; POL | 64.20 m	Daniel Ståhl; SWE | 64.18 m	Robert Harting; GER | 63.96 m
Women's 100m (+0.4 m/s)	Elaine Thompson-Herah; JAM | 10.92	Marie-Josée Ta Lou; CIV | 10.93	Blessing Okagbare; NGR | 11.07	Michelle-Lee Ahye; TTO | 11.07	Tianna Madison; USA | 11.14	Morolake Akinosun; USA | 11.15	Jura Levy; JAM | 11.17	Christania Williams; JAM | 11.35
Women's 400m	Shaunae Miller-Uibo; BAH | 49.46	Salwa Eid Naser; BRN | 49.88	Courtney Okolo; USA | 50.91	Natasha Hastings; USA | 50.98	Shericka Jackson; JAM | 51.16	Novlene Williams-Mills; JAM | 51.27	Stephenie Ann McPherson; JAM | 51.72	Lydia Jele; BOT | 53.11
Women's 1500m	Faith Kipyegon; KEN | 3:57.04	Sifan Hassan; NED | 3:57.22	Winny Chebet; KEN | 4:00.18	Gudaf Tsegay; ETH | 4:00.36	Meraf Bahta; SWE | 4:00.49	Jenny Simpson; USA | 4:00.70	Laura Weightman; GBR | 4:00.71	Angelika Cichocka; POL | 4:02.77
Women's 5000m	Hellen Obiri; KEN | 14:25.88	Caroline Chepkoech Kipkirui; KEN | 14:27.55	Senbere Teferi; ETH | 14:32.03	Margaret Chelimo Kipkemboi; KEN | 14:32.82	Beatrice Chepkoech; KEN | 14:39.33	Lilian Kasait Rengeruk; KEN | 14:41.61	Letesenbet Gidey; ETH | 14:42.74	Eilish McColgan; GBR | 14:48.49
Women's 400mH	Dalilah Muhammad; USA | 53.89	Zuzana Hejnová; CZE | 53.93	Ashley Spencer; USA | 54.92	Eilidh Doyle; GBR | 55.04	Sara Slott Petersen; DEN | 55.54	Janieve Russell; JAM | 55.60	Lea Sprunger; SUI | 55.98	Wenda Nel; RSA | 56.30
Women's High Jump	Mariya Lasitskene; ANA | 2.02 m	Yuliia Levchenko; UKR | 1.94 m	Michaela Hrubá; CZE | 1.88 m	Nafissatou Thiam; BEL | 1.88 m	Kamila Lićwinko; POL | 1.88 m	Sofie Skoog; SWE | 1.84 m	Levern Spencer; LCA | 1.84 m	Mirela Demireva; BUL | 1.84 m
Women's Pole Vault	Aikaterini Stefanidi; GRE | 4.85 m	Sandi Morris; USA | 4.75 m	Alysha Newman; CAN | 4.75 m	Katie Moon; USA | 4.65 m	Nicole Büchler; SUI | 4.65 m	Holly Bradshaw; GBR | 4.55 m	Lisa Ryzih; GER | 4.55 m	Michaela Meijer; SWE | 4.55 m
Women's Long Jump	Ivana Vuleta; SRB | 6.70 m	Lorraine Ugen; GBR | 6.65 m	Sha'keela Saunders; USA | 6.64 m	Tianna Madison; USA | 6.63 m	Brittney Reese; USA | 6.61 m	Shara Proctor; GBR | 6.50 m	Darya Klishina; ANA | 6.49 m	Claudia Salman-Rath; GER | 6.21 m
Women's Discus Throw	Sandra Perković; CRO | 68.82 m	Dani Stevens; AUS | 65.85 m	Denia Caballero; CUB | 64.61 m	Nadine Müller; GER | 62.85 m	Melina Robert-Michon; FRA | 62.49 m	Whitney Ashley; USA | 62.14 m	Yaimé Pérez; CUB | 61.45 m	Julia Harting; GER | 59.89 m

== Diamond League Finals ==
=== Men ===
==== 100 metres ====
Qualification

Rank	Name	Nationality	Wins	Points
1	Andre De Grasse	Canada	2	25
2	Ben Youssef Meïté	Ivory Coast		24
3	Akani Simbine	South Africa	1	20
4	Chijindu Ujah	Great Britain		18
5	Justin Gatlin	United States	1	17
6	Isiah Young	United States		12
7	Su Bingtian	China		11
8	Ronnie Baker	United States	1	10
9	Usain Bolt	Jamaica	1	8
10	Asafa Powell	Jamaica		7 *
11	Adam Gemili	Great Britain		7 *
12	Mike Rodgers	United States		6
13	Femi Ogunode	Qatar		6
14	Churandy Martina	Netherlands		6
15	Yunier Pérez	Cuba		6
16	Ryan Shields	Jamaica		6
17	James Dasaolu	Great Britain		4
18	Aaron Brown	Canada		4
19	Alex Wilson	Switzerland		4 *
20	Julian Reus	Germany		4
21	Henricho Bruintjies	South Africa		3
22	Christopher Belcher	United States		2
23	Reece Prescod	Great Britain		2
24	Kim Collins	Saint Kitts and Nevis		2
25	Austin Hamilton	Sweden		1
26	Jimmy Vicaut	France		1

Top 8 qualified as of right.

Athletes marked with * called up as reserves for Final

Final

Rank	Lane	Name	Nationality	Time	Notes
	5	C.J. Ujah	Great Britain	9.97	SB
2	7	Ben Youssef Meïté	Ivory Coast	9.97	SB
3	8	Ronnie Baker	United States	10.01	
4	3	Justin Gatlin	United States	10.04	
5	6	Isiah Young	United States	10.10	
6	4	Akani Simbine	South Africa	10.10	
7	2	Asafa Powell	Jamaica	10.11	
8	1	Adam Gemili	Great Britain	10.13	
9	9	Alex Wilson	Switzerland	20.80	

==== 200 metres ====
Qualification

Rank	Name	Nationality	Wins	Points
1	Ameer Webb	United States	1	38
2	Andre De Grasse	Canada	2	16
3	Ramil Guliyev	Turkey	2	16
4	Aaron Brown	Canada		13
5	Fred Kerley	United States		12
6	Churandy Martina	Netherlands		11
7	Rasheed Dwyer	Jamaica		11
8	Zharnel Hughes	United Kingdom		10
9	Christophe Lemaitre	France		10 *
10	Nethaneel Mitchell-Blake	United Kingdom		9 *
11	Noah Lyles	United States	1	8 *
12	Isiah Young	United States		7
13	LaShawn Merritt	United States		7
14	Daniel Talbot	United Kingdom		6
15	Adam Gemili	United Kingdom		6
16	Filippo Tortu	Italy		5
17	Isaac Makwala	Botswana		5
18	Clarence Munyai	South Africa		4
19	Xie Zhenye	China		4
20	Lykourgos-Stefanos Tsakonas	Greece		4
21	Brendon Rodney	Canada		4
22	Dedric Dukes	United States		3
23	Warren Weir	Jamaica		2
24	Jeffrey John	France		2
25	Alonso Edward	Panama		2
26	Ben Bassaw	France		1

Top 8 qualified as of right.

Athletes marked with * called up as reserves for Final

Final

Rank	Lane	Name	Nationality	Time	Notes
	9	Noah Lyles	United States	20.00	
2	6	Ameer Webb	United States	20.01	SB
3	5	Ramil Guliyev	Turkey	20.02	SB
4	4	Aaron Brown	Canada	20.17	SB
5	8	Christophe Lemaitre	France	20.21	SB
6	3	Zharnel Hughes	United Kingdom	20.27	
7	7	Nethaneel Mitchell-Blake	United Kingdom	20.33	
8	2	Rasheed Dwyer	Jamaica	20.67	

==== 400 metres ====
Qualification

Rank	Name	Nationality	Wins	Points
1	Baboloki Thebe	Botswana	1	35
2	Vernon Norwood	United States		19
3	Wayde van Niekerk	South Africa	2	16
4	Steven Gardiner	Bahamas	2	16
5	Tony McQuay	United States		16
6	LaShawn Merritt	United States	1	15
7	Isaac Makwala	Botswana		13
8	Pavel Maslák	Czech Republic		12
9	Kevin Borlée	Belgium		11 *
10	Matthew Hudson-Smith	United Kingdom		9
11	Luka Janežič	Slovenia		8
12	Rafał Omelko	Poland		8
13	Gil Roberts	United States		5 *
14	Karabo Sibanda	Botswana		5
15	Michael Cherry	United States		4
16	Pieter Conradie	South Africa		4 *
17	Luguelín Santos	Dominican Republic		3
18	Liemarvin Bonevacia	Netherlands		3 *
19	Paul Dedewo	United States		3
20	Rabah Yousif	United Kingdom		3
21	Jonathan Borlée	Belgium		2
22	Onkabetse Nkobolo	Botswana		2
23	Teddy Atine-Venel	France		1
24	Mauritz Kashagen	Norway		1

Top 8 qualified as of right.

Athletes marked with * called up as reserves for Final

Final

Rank	Lane	Name	Nationality	Time	Notes
	6	Isaac Makwala	Botswana	43.95	
2	5	Gil Roberts	United States	44.54	
3	3	Vernon Norwood	United States	45.01	
4	7	Pavel Maslák	Czech Republic	45.67	
5	2	Kevin Borlée	Belgium	45.77	
6	1	Liemarvin Bonevacia	Netherlands	46.31	
7	8	Pieter Conradie	South Africa	46.45	
	4	Steven Gardiner	Bahamas	DNF	

==== 800 metres ====
Qualification

Rank	Name	Nationality	Wins	Points
1	Nijel Amos	Botswana	4	32
2	Kipyegon Bett	Kenya	1	29
3	Adam Kszczot	Poland	1	21
4	Donavan Brazier	United States		19
5	Ferguson Cheruiyot Rotich	Kenya		16
6	Brandon McBride	Canada		14
7	Robert Biwott	Kenya		14
8	Marcin Lewandowski	Poland		12
9	Asbel Kiprop	Kenya		8 *
10	Elliot Giles	United Kingdom		8 *
11	Alfred Kipketer	Kenya		6 *
12	Erik Sowinski	United States		5
13	David Rudisha	Kenya		5
14	Elijah Motonei Manangoi	Kenya		5
15	Nicholas Kiplangat Kipkoech	Kenya		4
16	Amel Tuka	Bosnia and Herzegovina		4
17	Kyle Langford	United Kingdom		4
18	Job Kinyor	Kenya		3
19	Jake Wightman	United Kingdom		2
20	Pierre-Ambroise Bosse	France		2
21	Mostafa Smaili	Morocco		1
22	Thijmen Kupers	Netherlands		1
23	Guy Learmonth	United Kingdom		1

Top 8 qualified as of right.

Athletes marked with * called up as reserves for Final

Final

Rank	Lane	Name	Nationality	Time	Notes
	7	Nijel Amos	Botswana	1:44.53	
2	3	Marcin Lewandowski	Poland	1:44.77	SB
3	5	Adam Kszczot	Poland	1:44.84	SB
4	8	Kipyegon Bett	Kenya	1:45.21	
5	6	Ferguson Cheruiyot Rotich	Kenya	1:45.25	
6	4	Alfred Kipketer	Kenya	1:46.27	
7	1	Elliot Giles	United Kingdom	1:47.03	
8	2	Asbel Kiprop	Kenya	1:49.85	
	9	Bram Som (PM)	Netherlands	DNF	

==== 1500 metres ====
Qualification

Rank	Name	Nationality	Wins	Points
1	Elijah Motonei Manangoi	Kenya	2	30
2	Timothy Cheruiyot	Kenya	1	25
3	Aman Wote	Ethiopia	1	15
4	Silas Kiplagat	Kenya		15
5	Filip Ingebrigtsen	Norway		15
6	Vincent Kibet	Kenya		15
7	Ronald Kwemoi	Kenya	1	14
8	Charles Cheboi Simotwo	Kenya		10
9	Marcin Lewandowski	Poland		9
10	Jake Wightman	United Kingdom	1	8
11	Alsadik Mikhou	Bahrain		7
12	Bethwell Birgen	Kenya		7
13	Asbel Kiprop	Kenya		5 *
14	Jakub Holuša	Czech Republic		5 *
15	Ryan Gregson	Australia		5
16	David Torrence	Peru		5
17	Homiyu Tesfaye	Germany		4
18	Clayton Murphy	United States		4
19	Robert Biwott	Kenya		3
20	Ayanleh Souleiman	Djibouti		3
21	Abdelaati Iguider	Morocco		3
22	Charlie Grice	United Kingdom		3
23	Chris O'Hare	United Kingdom		2
24	Matthew Centrowitz	United States		2
25	Ben Blankenship	United States		2

Top 12 qualified as of right.

Athletes marked with * called up as reserves for Final

Final

Rank	Name	Nationality	Time	Notes
	Timothy Cheruiyot	Kenya	3:33.93	
2	Silas Kiplagat	Kenya	3:34.26	
3	Elijah Motonei Manangoi	Kenya	3:34.65	
4	Asbel Kiprop	Kenya	3:34.77	
5	Charles Cheboi Simotwo	Kenya	3:34.93	
6	Vincent Kibet	Kenya	3:34.96	
7	Jake Wightman	United Kingdom	3:35.25	
8	Jakub Holuša	Czech Republic	3:35.81	
9	Marcin Lewandowski	Poland	3:36.02	
10	Alsadik Mikhou	Bahrain	3:36.04	
11	Bethwell Birgen	Kenya	3:38.87	
12	Filip Ingebrigtsen	Norway	3:41.36	
	Jackson Mumbwa Kivuva (PM)	Kenya	DNF	
	Andrew Kiptoo Rotich (PM)	Kenya	DNF	

==== 5000 metres ====
Qualification

Rank	Name	Nationality	Wins	Points
1	Yomif Kejelcha	Ethiopia		19
2	Muktar Edris	Ethiopia	2	19
3	Joshua Cheptegei	Uganda		16
4	Ronald Kwemoi	Kenya	1	15
5	Paul Chelimo	United States		9
6	Albert Rop	Bahrain		8
7	Mo Farah	United Kingdom	1	8
8	Selemon Barega	Ethiopia		7
9	Ben True	United States		6
10	Yenew Alamirew	Ethiopia		6
11	Geoffrey Kamworor	Kenya		6
12	Caleb Mwangangi Ndiku	Kenya		5
13	Adel Mechaal	Spain		4 *
14	Birhanu Legese	Ethiopia		4 *
15	Mohammed Ahmed	Canada		3 *
16	Patrick Tiernan	Australia		2
17	Jacob Kiplimo	Uganda		2
18	Andrew Butchart	United Kingdom		2
19	Dawit Wolde	Ethiopia		2
20	Solomon Berihu	Ethiopia		1

Top 12 qualified as of right.

Athletes marked with * called up as reserves for Final

Final

Rank	Name	Nationality	Time	Notes
	Mo Farah	United Kingdom	13:06.05	
2	Muktar Edris	Ethiopia	13:06.09	
3	Yomif Kejelcha	Ethiopia	13:06.18	
4	Selemon Barega	Ethiopia	13:07.35	
5	Mohammed Ahmed	Canada	13:10.26	
6	Yenew Alamirew	Ethiopia	13:13.08	
7	Albert Rop	Bahrain	13:14.31	
8	Ben True	United States	13:17.62	
9	Birhanu Legese	Ethiopia	13:24.89	SB
10	Ronald Kwemoi	Kenya	13:55.56	
	Collins Cheboi (PM)	Kenya	DNF	
	Cornelius Kangogo (PM)	Kenya	DNF	
	Adel Mechaal	Spain	DNF	
	Paul Chelimo	United States	DQ	

==== 3000 metres steeplechase ====
Qualification

Rank	Name	Nationality	Wins	Points
1	Soufiane El Bakkali	Morocco	2	23
2	Jairus Kipchoge Birech	Kenya		20
3	Amos Kirui	Kenya		15
4	Yemane Haileselassie	Eritrea		11
5	Evan Jager	United States	1	8
6	Conseslus Kipruto	Kenya	1	8
7	Andrew Bayer	United States		8
8	Stanley Kipkoech Kebenei	United States		6
9	Abraham Kibiwot	Kenya		6
10	Nicholas Kiptanui Bett	Kenya		6
11	Benjamin Kigen	Kenya		5
12	Hillary Bor	United States		5
13	Chala Beyo	Ethiopia		5
14	Sebastián Martos	Spain		4 *
15	Ibrahim Ezzaydouny	Morocco		3
16	Lawrence Kemboi Kipsang	Kenya		3
17	Barnabas Kipyego	Kenya		2
18	Hailemariyam Amare	Ethiopia		2
19	Clement Kimutai Kemboi	Kenya		2
20	Altobelli Santos Da Silva	Brazil		1
21	Krystian Zalewski	Poland		1

Top 12 qualified as of right.

Athletes marked with * called up as reserves for Final

Final

Rank	Name	Nationality	Time	Notes
	Conseslus Kipruto	Kenya	8:04.73	
2	Soufiane El Bakkali	Morocco	8:04.83	PB
3	Evan Jager	United States	8:11.71	
4	Stanley Kipkoech Kebenei	United States	8:11.93	
5	Nicholas Kiptanui Bett	Kenya	8:12.20	SB
6	Benjamin Kigen	Kenya	8:13.06	
7	Amos Kirui	Kenya	8:18.32	
8	Yemane Haileselassie	Eritrea	8:19.19	
9	Jairus Kipchoge Birech	Kenya	8:25.58	
10	Andrew Bayer	United States	8:26.15	
11	Abraham Kibiwot	Kenya	8:33.76	
12	Sebastián Martos	Spain	8:44.23	
	John Kibet Koech (PM)	Bahrain	DNF	
	Haron Lagat (PM)	United States	DNF	

==== 110 metres hurdles ====
Qualification

Rank	Name	Nationality	Wins	Points
1	Sergey Shubenkov	Authorised Neutral Athletes		29
2	Aries Merritt	United States	3	27
3	Orlando Ortega	Spain	1	26
4	Andrew Pozzi	United Kingdom		15
5	Milan Trajkovic	Cyprus		14
6	Shane Brathwaite	Barbados		12
7	Devon Allen	United States		11
8	Omar McLeod	Jamaica	1	10
9	Ronald Levy	Jamaica	1	8 *
10	Garfield Darien	France		6 *
11	Wenjun Xie	China		6
12	Aurel Manga	France		5
13	Hansle Parchment	Jamaica		5
14	Balázs Baji	Hungary		5
15	Antonio Alkana	South Africa		4
16	Jarret Eaton	United States		4
17	Damian Czykier	Poland		4
18	David Oliver	United States		4
19	Aaron Mallet	United States		3
20	Gregor Traber	Germany		2
21	Eddie Lovett	United States Virgin Islands		2
22	Johnathan Cabral	Canada		2
23	David King	United Kingdom		2
24	Lorenzo Perini	Italy		1
25	David Omoregie	United Kingdom		1

Top 8 qualified as of right.

Athletes marked with * called up as reserves for Final

Final

Rank	Lane	Name	Nationality	Time	Notes
	5	Sergey Shubenkov	Authorised Neutral Athletes	13.14	
2	7	Orlando Ortega	Spain	13.17	
3	6	Aries Merritt	United States	13.20	
4	4	Devon Allen	United States	13.24	
5	8	Ronald Levy	Jamaica	13.41	
6	9	Garfield Darien	France	13.42	
7	2	Milan Trajkovic	Cyprus	13.47	
8	3	Shane Brathwaite	Barbados	13.49	

==== 400 metres hurdles ====
Qualification

Rank	Name	Nationality	Wins	Points
1	Yasmani Copello	Turkey		19
2	Rasmus Mägi	Estonia		17
3	Karsten Warholm	Norway	2	16
4	Kerron Clement	United States	1	14
5	Bershawn Jackson	United States	1	11
6	LJ van Zyl	South Africa		10
7	Mamadou Kassé Hann	France		9
8	Jack Green	United Kingdom		8
9	Kyron McMaster	British Virgin Islands		7 *
10	Thomas Barr	Ireland		6
11	Kariem Hussein	Switzerland		6 *
12	Michael Stigler	United States		5
13	Eric Futch	United States		4
14	Javier Culson	Puerto Rico		4
15	Quincy Downing	United States		2
16	Annsert Whyte	Jamaica		2
17	Isak Andersson	Sweden		2
18	Jacob Paul	United Kingdom		1
19	Nicholas Bett	Kenya		1

Top 8 qualified as of right.

Athletes marked with * called up as reserves for Final

Final

Rank	Lane	Name	Nationality	Time	Notes
	4	Kyron McMaster	British Virgin Islands	48.07	
2	6	Karsten Warholm	Norway	48.22	NR
3	3	Kariem Hussein	Switzerland	48.45	=PB
4	7	Kerron Clement	United States	49.20	
5	5	Yasmani Copello	Turkey	49.23	
6	8	Jack Green	United Kingdom	49.41	
7	1	LJ van Zyl	South Africa	49.92	
8	2	Bershawn Jackson	United States	50.02	

==== High Jump ====
Qualification

Rank	Name	Nationality	Wins	Points
1	Mutaz Essa Barshim	Qatar	5	40
2	Robbie Grabarz	United Kingdom		23
3	Andriy Protsenko	Ukraine	1	19
4	Majed Aldin Ghazal	Syria		18
5	Bohdan Bondarenko	Ukraine		14
6	Donald Thomas	Bahamas		14
7	Tihomir Ivanov	Bulgaria		12
8	Michael Mason	Canada		11
9	Gianmarco Tamberi	Italy		9
10	Luis Castro Rivera	Puerto Rico		9
11	Mateusz Przybylko	Germany		8
12	Erik Kynard	United States		8
13	Yu Wang	China		7
14	Sylwester Bednarek	Poland		7 *
15	Derek Drouin	Canada		6
16	Pavel Seliverstau	Belarus		6
17	Tom Gale	United Kingdom		6 *
18	Zhang Guowei	China		6
19	Chris Baker	United Kingdom		2
20	Eure Yáñez	Venezuela		2
21	Takashi Eto	Japan		1
22	Bryan McBride	United States		1

Top 12 qualified as of right.

Athletes marked with * called up as reserves for Final

Final

Rank	Name	Nationality	Mark	Notes
	Mutaz Essa Barshim	Qatar	2.36	
2	Majed Aldin Ghazal	Syria	2.31	
3	Bohdan Bondarenko	Ukraine	2.31	
4	Robbie Grabarz	United Kingdom	2.24	
5	Michael Mason	Canada	2.24	
6	Andriy Protsenko	Ukraine	2.24	
7	Sylwester Bednarek	Poland	2.20	
8	Tom Gale	United Kingdom	2.20	
9	Mateusz Przybylko	Germany	2.20	
9	Donald Thomas	Bahamas	2.20	
11	Luis Castro Rivera	Puerto Rico	2.20	
12	Gianmarco Tamberi	Italy	2.16	

==== Pole Vault ====
Qualification

Rank	Name	Nationality	Wins	Points
1	Sam Kendricks	United States	4	32
2	Renaud Lavillenie	France		31
3	Shawn Barber	Canada		25
4	Piotr Lisek	Poland	1	23
5	Paweł Wojciechowski	Poland	1	21
6	Kévin Menaldo	France		16
7	Jan Kudlička	Czech Republic		12
8	Raphael Holzdeppe	Germany		12
9	Kurtis Marschall	Australia		8
10	Axel Chapelle	France		8
11	Armand Duplantis	Sweden		7
12	Konstantinos Filippidis	Greece		7
13	Thiago Braz	Brazil		5
14	Germán Chiaraviglio	Argentina		3 *
15	Changrui Xue	China		2
16	Stanley Joseph	France		2 *
17	Diogo Ferreira	Portugal		2
18	Hendrik Gruber	Germany		2
19	Valentin Lavillenie	France		1
20	Yao Jie	China		1

Top 12 qualified as of right.

Athletes marked with * called up as reserves for Final

Final

Rank	Name	Nationality	Mark	Notes
	Sam Kendricks	United States	5.87	
2	Piotr Lisek	Poland	5.80	
2	Paweł Wojciechowski	Poland	5.80	
4	Kurtis Marschall	Australia	5.73	=PB
5	Shawn Barber	Canada	5.63	
6	Kévin Menaldo	France	5.63	
7	Konstantinos Filippidis	Greece	5.48	
8	Dominik Alberto	Switzerland	5.48	
9	Germán Chiaraviglio	Argentina	5.48	
10	Stanley Joseph	France	5.33	
11	Jan Kudlička	Czech Republic	5.33	
	Renaud Lavillenie	France	NM	

==== Long Jump ====
Qualification

Rank	Name	Nationality	Wins	Points
1	Rushwal Samaai	South Africa	1	26
2	Luvo Manyonga	South Africa	2	16
3	Jarrion Lawson	United States	1	15
4	Michel Tornéus	Sweden		11
5	Emiliano Lasa	Uruguay		11
6	Godfrey Khotso Mokoena	South Africa		9
7	Michael Hartfield	United States		8
8	Xinglong Gao	China		7
9	Changzhou Huang	China		6
10	Yahya Berrabah	Morocco		6
11	Radek Juška	Czech Republic		6
12	Fabrice Lapierre	Australia		6 *
13	Yaoguang Zhang	China		5
14	Maykel Demetrio Massó	Cuba		4
15	Jeff Henderson	United States		3
16	Dan Bramble	United Kingdom		3
17	Andreas Otterling	Sweden		2

Top 8 qualified as of right.

Athletes marked with * called up as reserves for Final

Final

Rank	Name	Nationality	Mark	Notes
	Luvo Manyonga	South Africa	8.49	
2	Rushwal Samaai	South Africa	8.31	
3	Jarrion Lawson	United States	8.12	
4	Michel Tornéus	Sweden	8.09	
5	Fabrice Lapierre	Australia	7.94	
6	Emiliano Lasa	Uruguay	7.79	
7	Michael Hartfield	United States	7.67	
8	Benjamin Gföhler	Switzerland	7.49	
9	Godfrey Khotso Mokoena	South Africa	7.13	

==== Triple Jump ====
Qualification

Rank	Name	Nationality	Wins	Points
1	Christian Taylor	United States	3	31
2	Will Claye	United States		20
3	Alexis Copello	Azerbaijan		20
4	Pedro Pablo Pichardo	Cuba	1	13
5	Bin Dong	China		11
6	Jhon Murillo	Colombia		9
7	Max Hess	Germany		8
8	Jean-Marc Pontvianne	France		8
9	Omar Craddock	United States		7 *
10	Troy Doris	Guyana		5 *
11	Chris Benard	United States		4 *
12	Nelson Évora	Portugal		3
13	Karol Hoffmann	Poland		2
14	Hugues Fabrice Zango	Burkina Faso		1
15	Rashid Ahmed Al Mannai	Qatar		1

Top 8 qualified as of right.

Athletes marked with * called up as reserves for Final

Final

Rank	Name	Nationality	Mark	Notes
	Christian Taylor	United States	17.49	
2	Will Claye	United States	17.35	
3	Pedro Pablo Pichardo	Cuba	17.32	
4	Troy Doris	Guyana	16.64	
5	Alexis Copello	Azerbaijan	16.55	
6	Chris Benard	United States	16.37	
7	Jean-Marc Pontvianne	France	16.36	
8	Omar Craddock	United States	15.89	

==== Shot Put ====
Qualification

Rank	Name	Nationality	Wins	Points
1	Ryan Crouser	United States	3	31
2	Tom Walsh	New Zealand	1	22
3	David Storl	Germany		13
4	Tomas Stanek	Czech Republic		12
5	Darrell Hill	United States		12
6	Konrad Bukowiecki	Poland		10
7	Joe Kovacs	United States		8
8	O'Dayne Richards	Jamaica		7
9	Ryan Whiting	United States		6
10	Stipe Zunic	Croatia		6
11	Michał Haratyk	Poland		4
12	Franck Elemba	Republic of the Congo		4
13	Darlan Romani	Brazil		3
14	Tsanko Arnaudov	Portugal		2
15	Damien Birkinhead	Australia		2
16	Jacko Gill	New Zealand		1
17	Kurt Roberts	United States		1

Final

Rank	Name	Nationality	Mark	Notes
	Darrell Hill	United States	22.44	MR, PB
2	Ryan Crouser	United States	22.37	
3	Joe Kovacs	United States	21.62	
4	David Storl	Germany	21.47	
5	Tomas Stanek	Czech Republic	21.39	
6	Tom Walsh	New Zealand	21.38	
7	O'Dayne Richards	Jamaica	21.07	
8	Konrad Bukowiecki	Poland	20.54	

==== Discus Throw ====
Qualification

Rank	Name	Nationality	Wins	Points
1	Daniel Ståhl	Sweden	2	29
2	Philip Milanov	Belgium	1	25
3	Fedrick Dacres	Jamaica	1	22
4	Andrius Gudžius	Lithuania		15
5	Piotr Małachowski	Poland		12
6	Christoph Harting	Germany		9
7	Robert Harting	Germany		8
8	Robert Urbanek	Poland		8
9	Lukas Weisshaidinger	Austria		6
10	Andrew Evans	United States		3
11	Mason Finley	United States		2
12	Daniel Jasinski	Germany		2
13	Sven Martin Skagestad	Norway		1
14	Axel Härstedt	Sweden		1
15	Martin Kupper	Estonia		1

Final

Rank	Name	Nationality	Mark	Notes
	Andrius Gudžius	Lithuania	68.16	
2	Fedrick Dacres	Jamaica	66.31	
3	Piotr Małachowski	Poland	65.73	
4	Philip Milanov	Belgium	64.76	
5	Christoph Harting	Germany	64.55	SB
6	Robert Urbanek	Poland	64.20	
7	Daniel Ståhl	Sweden	64.18	
8	Robert Harting	Germany	63.96	

==== Javelin Throw ====
Qualification

Rank	Name	Nationality	Wins	Points
1	Thomas Röhler	Germany	3	30
2	Johannes Vetter	Germany	1	28
3	Jakub Vadlejch	Czech Republic		25
4	Tero Pitkämäki	Finland		14
5	Keshorn Walcott	Trinidad and Tobago		10
6	Ahmed Bader Magour	Qatar		9
7	Julius Yego	Kenya		7
8	Neeraj Chopra	India		6
9	Magnus Kirt	Estonia		6 *
10	Hamish Peacock	Australia		5
11	Kim Amb	Sweden		1
12	Andreas Hofmann	Germany		1
13	Andrian Mardare	Moldova		1
14	Bernhard Seifert	Germany		1

Top 8 qualified as of right.

Athletes marked with * called up as reserves for Final

Final

Rank	Name	Nationality	Mark	Notes
	Jakub Vadlejch	Czech Republic	88.50	
2	Thomas Röhler	Germany	86.59	
3	Tero Pitkämäki	Finland	86.57	
4	Johannes Vetter	Germany	86.15	
5	Keshorn Walcott	Trinidad and Tobago	85.11	
6	Magnus Kirt	Estonia	84.73	
7	Neeraj Chopra	India	83.80	
8	Ahmed Bader Magour	Qatar	83.73	

=== Women ===
==== 100 metres ====
Qualification

Rank	Name	Nationality	Wins	Points
1	Elaine Thompson	Jamaica	5	40
2	Marie-Josée Ta Lou	Ivory Coast		34
3	Blessing Okagbare	Nigeria		22
4	Michelle-Lee Ahye	Trinidad and Tobago		21
5	Dafne Schippers	Netherlands	1	18
6	Morolake Akinosun	United States		11
7	Murielle Ahouré	Ivory Coast		9
8	Jura Levy	Jamaica		8
9	Christania Williams	Jamaica		8 *
10	Tori Bowie	United States		7
11	Daryll Neita	United Kingdom		5
12	Tianna Bartoletta	United States		5 *
13	Kelly-Ann Baptiste	Trinidad and Tobago		4
14	Carolle Zahi	France		4
15	Dina Asher-Smith	United Kingdom		4
16	Asha Philip	United Kingdom		3
17	Veronica Campbell-Brown	Jamaica		3
18	Desirèe Henry	United Kingdom		3
19	Gina Lückenkemper	Germany		2
20	Rosângela Santos	Brazil		1
21	Aaliyah Brown	United States		1
22	Floriane Gnafoua	France		1
22	Shaunae Miller-Uibo	Bahamas		1
24	Mujinga Kambundji	Switzerland		1

Top 8 qualified as of right.

Athletes marked with * called up as reserves for Final

Final

Rank	Lane	Name	Nationality	Time	Notes
	5	Elaine Thompson	Jamaica	10.92	
2	6	Marie-Josée Ta Lou	Ivory Coast	10.93	
3	4	Blessing Okagbare	Nigeria	11.07	
4	8	Michelle-Lee Ahye	Trinidad and Tobago	11.07	
5	7	Tianna Bartoletta	United States	11.14	
6	2	Morolake Akinosun	United States	11.15	
7	9	Jura Levy	Jamaica	11.17	
8	3	Christania Williams	Jamaica	11.35	

==== 200 metres ====
Qualification

Rank	Name	Nationality	Wins	Points
1	Dafne Schippers	Netherlands	2	28
2	Marie-Josée Ta Lou	Ivory Coast	1	24
3	Murielle Ahouré	Ivory Coast	1	15
4	Elaine Thompson	Jamaica	1	14
5	Kyra Jefferson	United States		13
6	Simone Facey	Jamaica		11
7	Kimberlyn Duncan	United States		9
8	Tori Bowie	United States	1	8
9	Shaunae Miller-Uibo	Bahamas		7 *
10	Jenna Prandini	United States		7
11	Crystal Emmanuel	Canada		7 *
12	Rebekka Haase	Germany		6
13	Ivet Lalova-Collio	Bulgaria		6
14	Dina Asher-Smith	United Kingdom		6
15	Bianca Williams	United Kingdom		6
16	Ella Nelson	Australia		6
17	Gina Lückenkemper	Germany		5
18	Allyson Felix	United States		4
19	Veronica Campbell-Brown	Jamaica		4
20	Estela Garcia	Spain		4
21	Finette Agyapong	United Kingdom		4
22	Mujinga Kambundji	Switzerland		3 *
23	Blessing Okagbare	Nigeria		3
24	Gloria Hooper	Italy		3
25	Fanny Peltier	France		3
26	Desirèe Henry	United Kingdom		2
27	Maroussia Pare	France		2
28	Nadine Gonska	Germany		2
29	Sarah Atcho	Switzerland		1
30	Joanna Atkins	United States		1
31	Elin Ostlund	Sweden		1

Top 8 qualified as of right.

Athletes marked with * called up as reserves for Final

Final

Rank	Lane	Name	Nationality	Time	Notes
	7	Shaunae Miller-Uibo	Bahamas	21.88	NR
2	6	Elaine Thompson	Jamaica	22.00	
3	4	Marie-Josée Ta Lou	Ivory Coast	22.09	
4	5	Dafne Schippers	Netherlands	22.36	
5	3	Kyra Jefferson	United States	22.61	
6	2	Mujinga Kambundji	Switzerland	22.71	
7	1	Simone Facey	Jamaica	22.80	
8	8	Crystal Emmanuel	Canada	23.94	

==== 400 metres ====
Qualification

Rank	Name	Nationality	Wins	Points
1	Novlene Williams-Mills	Jamaica	1	34
2	Natasha Hastings	United States	1	25
3	Courtney Okolo	United States		23
4	Shericka Jackson	Jamaica		17
5	Shaunae Miller-Uibo	Bahamas	2	16
6	Olha Zemlyak	Ukraine		16
7	Allyson Felix	United States	1	15
8	Floria Gueï	France		10
9	Salwa Eid Naser	Bahrain	1	8 *
10	Lydia Jele	Botswana		8 *
11	Shamier Little	United States		6
12	Quanera Hayes	United States		6
13	Stephenie Ann McPherson	Jamaica		6 *
14	Phyllis Francis	United States		5
15	Anneisha McLaughlin-Whilby	Jamaica		4
16	Justyna Święty	Poland		4
17	Caster Semenya	South Africa		2
18	Léa Sprunger	Switzerland		2
19	Emily Diamond	United Kingdom		2
20	Chrisann Gordon	Jamaica		2
21	Déborah Sananes	France		2
22	Morgan Mitchell	Australia		1
23	Zoey Clark	United Kingdom		1

Top 8 qualified as of right.

Athletes marked with * called up as reserves for Final

Final

Rank	Lane	Name	Nationality	Time	Notes
	7	Shaunae Miller-Uibo	Bahamas	49.46	WL, SB
2	6	Salwa Eid Naser	Bahrain	49.88	NR
3	4	Courtney Okolo	United States	50.91	
4	9	Natasha Hastings	United States	50.98	
5	3	Shericka Jackson	Jamaica	51.16	
6	8	Novlene Williams-Mills	Jamaica	51.27	
7	5	Stephenie Ann McPherson	Jamaica	51.72	
8	2	Lydia Jele	Botswana	53.11	

==== 800 metres ====
Qualification

Rank	Name	Nationality	Wins	Points
1	Francine Niyonsaba	Burundi	2	36
2	Caster Semenya	South Africa	4	32
3	Margaret Nyairera Wambui	Kenya		20
4	Melissa Bishop	Canada		16
5	Lovisa Lindh	Sweden		15
6	Eunice Jepkoech Sum	Kenya		12
7	Charlene Lipsey	United States		11
8	Sifan Hassan	Netherlands		10
9	Habitam Alemu	Ethiopia		10 *
10	Selina Büchel	Switzerland		10 *
11	Lynsey Sharp	United Kingdom		8
12	Ajeé Wilson	United States		6
13	Rose Mary Almanza	Cuba		5
14	Anita Hinriksdottir	Iceland		5
15	Laura Muir	United Kingdom		4
16	Genzebe Dibaba	Ethiopia		4
17	Olha Lyakhova	Ukraine		4
18	Brenda Martinez	United States		2
19	Joanna Jóźwik	Poland		2
20	Malika Akkaoui	Morocco		2
21	Nataliya Pryshchepa	Ukraine		1
22	Natoya Goule	Jamaica		1

Top 8 qualified as of right.

Athletes marked with * called up as reserves for Final

Final

Rank	Lane	Name	Nationality	Time	Notes
	7	Caster Semenya	South Africa	1:55.84	
2	6	Francine Niyonsaba	Burundi	1:56.71	
3	3	Margaret Nyairera Wambui	Kenya	1:56.87	PB
4	1	Habitam Alemu	Ethiopia	1:57.05	NR
5	5-1	Sifan Hassan	Netherlands	1:57.12	
6	8-1	Charlene Lipsey	United States	1:57.99	
7	4	Melissa Bishop	Canada	1:58.30	
8	5-2	Selina Büchel	Switzerland	1:59.83	
9	2	Eunice Jepkoech Sum	Kenya	2:04.31	
	8-2	Sanne Verstegen (PM)	Netherlands	DNF	

==== 1500 metres ====
Qualification

Rank	Name	Nationality	Wins	Points
1	Angelika Cichocka	Poland	1	27
2	Winny Chebet	Kenya		23
3	Rababe Arafi	Morocco		22
2	Sifan Hassan	Netherlands	2	16
5	Faith Kipyegon	Kenya	1	15
6	Gudaf Tsegay	Ethiopia		15
7	Dawit Seyaum	Ethiopia	1	15
8	Meraf Bahta	Sweden		9
9	Laura Weightman	United Kingdom		9
10	Besu Sado	Ethiopia		8
11	Malika Akkaoui	Morocco		8
12	Hellen Obiri	Kenya	1	8
13	Laura Muir	United Kingdom		7
14	Konstanze Klosterhalfen	Germany		6
15	Brenda Martinez	United States		6
16	Jenny Simpson	United States		6 *
17	Nelly Jepkosgei	Kenya		4
18	Shannon Rowbury	United States		3
19	Claudia Bobocea	Romania		2
20	Ciara Mageean	Ireland		2
21	Maureen Koster	Netherlands		1
22	Zoe Buckman	Australia		1
23	Judith Kiyeng	Kenya		1
24	Katie Mackey	United States		1
25	Melissa Courtney	United Kingdom		1

Top 12 qualified as of right.

Athletes marked with * called up as reserves for Final

Final

Rank	Name	Nationality	Time	Notes
	Faith Kipyegon	Kenya	3:57.04	SB
2	Sifan Hassan	Netherlands	3:57.22	
3	Winny Chebet	Kenya	4:00.18	
4	Gudaf Tsegay	Ethiopia	4:00.36	
5	Meraf Bahta	Sweden	4:00.49	PB
6	Jenny Simpson	United States	4:00.70	SB
7	Laura Weightman	United Kingdom	4:00.71	SB
8	Angelika Cichocka	Poland	4:02.77	
9	Besu Sado	Ethiopia	4:03.83	
10	Rababe Arafi	Morocco	4:07.22	
11	Malika Akkaoui	Morocco	4:10.76	
12	Dawit Seyaum	Ethiopia	4:12.92	
	Jennifer Meadows (PM)	United Kingdom	DNF	
	Emily Cherotich Tuei (PM)	Kenya	DNF	

==== 5000 metres ====
Qualification

Rank	Name	Nationality	Wins	Points
1	Hellen Obiri	Kenya	3	29
2	Margaret Chelimo Kipkemboi	Kenya		13
3	Letesenbet Gidey	Ethiopia		12
4	Agnes Jebet Tirop	Kenya		10
5	Eilish McColgan	United Kingdom		9
6	Sifan Hassan	Netherlands	1	8
7	Beatrice Chepkoech	Kenya		7
8	Konstanze Klosterhalfen	Germany		7
9	Lilian Kasait Rengeruk	Kenya		7
10	Senbere Teferi	Ethiopia		7
11	Laura Muir	United Kingdom		6
12	Yasemin Can	Turkey		5
13	Etenesh Diro Neda	Ethiopia		4 *
14	Caroline Chepkoech Kipkirui	Kenya		4 *
15	Shannon Rowbury	United States		3
16	Genzebe Dibaba	Ethiopia		3
17	Sofia Assefa	Ethiopia		3 *
18	Susan Krumins	Netherlands		2 *
19	Sentayehu Lewetegn	Ethiopia		2
20	Shelby Houlihan	United States		1
21	Irine Chebet Cheptai	Kenya		1
22	Mercyline Chelangat	Uganda		1

Top 12 qualified as of right.

Athletes marked with * called up as reserves for Final

Final

Rank	Name	Nationality	Time	Notes
	Hellen Obiri	Kenya	14:25.88	
2	Caroline Chepkoech Kipkirui	Kenya	14:27.55	PB
3	Senbere Teferi	Ethiopia	14:32.03	
4	Margaret Chelimo Kipkemboi	Kenya	14:32.82	PB
5	Beatrice Chepkoech	Kenya	14:39.33	
6	Lilian Kasait Rengeruk	Kenya	14:41.61	
7	Letesenbet Gidey	Ethiopia	14:42.74	
8	Eilish McColgan	United Kingdom	14:48.49	PB
9	Susan Krumins	Netherlands	14:51.25	PB
10	Agnes Jebet Tirop	Kenya	14:52.39	
11	Etenesh Diro Neda	Ethiopia	15:07.69	
	Genevieve Lacaze (PM)	Australia	DNF	
	Tamara Tverdostup (PM)	Ukraine	DNF	
	Sofia Assefa	Ethiopia	DNS	

==== 3000 metres steeplechase ====
Qualification

Rank	Name	Nationality	Wins	Points
1	Hyvin Kiyeng	Kenya	1	15
2	Beatrice Chepkoech	Kenya	1	15
3	Norah Jeruto	Kenya	1	15
4	Ruth Jebet	Bahrain		11
5	Celliphine Chepteek Chespol	Kenya		11
6	Sofia Assefa	Ethiopia		10
7	Gesa Felicitas Krause	Germany	1	10
8	Purity Kirui	Kenya		9
9	Emma Coburn	United States		8
10	Fabienne Schlumpf	Switzerland		7
11	Roseline Chepngetich	Kenya		6
12	Fadwa Sidi Madane	Morocco		5
13	Luiza Gega	Albania		4
14	Etenesh Diro Neda	Ethiopia		3 *
15	Aisha Praught	Jamaica		3
16	Winfred Mutile Yavi	Bahrain		3
17	Daisy Jepkemei	Kenya		3
18	Joan Chepkemoi	Kenya		2
19	Caroline Tuigong	Kenya		2
20	Tigest Getent Mekonen	Bahamas		1
21	Stephanie Garcia	United States		1

Top 12 qualified as of right.

Athletes marked with * called up as reserves for Final

Final

Rank	Name	Nationality	Time	Notes
	Ruth Jebet	Bahrain	8:55.29	WL, MR
2	Beatrice Chepkoech	Kenya	8:59.84	PB
3	Norah Jeruto	Kenya	9:05.31	PB
4	Emma Coburn	United States	9:14.81	
5	Hyvin Kiyeng	Kenya	9:14.93	
6	Gesa Felicitas Krause	Germany	9:15.85	
7	Sofia Assefa	Ethiopia	9:16.45	
8	Celliphine Chepteek Chespol	Kenya	9:17.56	
9	Etenesh Diro Neda	Ethiopia	9:20.94	
10	Fabienne Schlumpf	Switzerland	9:28.80	
11	Purity Kirui	Kenya	9:40.89	
	Ann Gathoni (PM)	Kenya	DNF	
	Fadwa Sidi Madane	Morocco	DNF	
	Caroline Tuigong (PM)	Kenya	DNF	

==== 100 metres hurdles ====
Qualification

Rank	Name	Nationality	Wins	Points
1	Sharika Nelvis	United States	1	31
2	Kendra Harrison	United States	3	24
3	Christina Manning	United States		21
4	Jasmin Stowers	United States	1	18
5	Nia Ali	United States		17
6	Kristi Castlin	United States		14
7	Sally Pearson	Australia		11
8	Pamela Dutkiewicz	Germany	1	10
9	Dawn Harper-Nelson	United States		9 *
10	Isabelle Pedersen	Norway		9
11	Queen Harrison	United States		7
12	Cindy Roleder	Germany		7
13	Danielle Williams	Jamaica		6 *
14	Alina Talay	Belarus		6 *
15	Tiffany Porter	United Kingdom		4
16	Megan Simmonds	Jamaica		4
17	Nadine Visser	Netherlands		3
18	Anne Zagre	Belgium		3
19	Phylicia George	Canada		3
20	Eefje Boons	Netherlands		2
21	Nadine Hildebrand	Germany		2
22	Cindy Ofili	United Kingdom		2
23	Raven Clay	United States		1
24	Noemi Zbaren	Switzerland		1

Top 8 qualified as of right.

Athletes marked with * called up as reserves for Final

Final

Rank	Lane	Name	Nationality	Time	Notes
	6	Sally Pearson	Australia	12.55	
2	5	Sharika Nelvis	United States	12.55	
3	7	Christina Manning	United States	12.67	
4	8	Danielle Williams	Jamaica	12.73	
5	2	Alina Talay	Belarus	12.80	SB
6	4	Dawn Harper-Nelson	United States	12.93	
7	3	Jasmin Stowers	United States	12.95	
8	9	Kristi Castlin	United States	13.03	

==== 400 metres hurdles ====
Qualification

Rank	Name	Nationality	Wins	Points
1	Zuzana Hejnová	Czech Republic	2	25
2	Eilidh Doyle	United Kingdom		17
3	Ashley Spencer	United States	2	16
4	Sara Slott Petersen	Denmark		15
5	Janieve Russel	Jamaica		14
6	Shamier Little	United States		13
7	Léa Sprunger	Switzerland		12
8	Dalilah Muhammad	United States		11
9	Georganne Moline	United States		6
10	Wenda Nel	South Africa		4 *
11	Kori Carter	United States		2
12	Cassandra Tate	United States		2
13	Ristananna Tracey	Jamaica		2
14	Rhonda Whyte	Jamaica		1

Top 8 qualified as of right.

Athletes marked with * called up as reserves for Final

Final

Rank	Lane	Name	Nationality	Time	Notes
	6	Dalilah Muhammad	United States	53.89	
2	7	Zuzana Hejnová	Czech Republic	53.93	SB
3	5	Ashley Spencer	United States	54.92	
4	4	Eilidh Doyle	United Kingdom	55.04	
5	3	Sara Slott Petersen	Denmark	55.54	
6	9	Janieve Russel	Jamaica	55.60	
7	8	Léa Sprunger	Switzerland	55.98	
8	2	Wenda Nel	South Africa	56.30	

==== High Jump ====
Qualification

Rank	Name	Nationality	Wins	Points
1	Mariya Lasitskene	Authorised Neutral Athletes	6	48
2	Kamila Lićwinko	Poland		28
3	Vashti Cunningham	United States		19
4	Yuliya Levchenko	Ukraine		18
5	Sofie Skoog	Sweden		17
6	Alessia Trost	Italy		16
7	Erika Kinsey	Sweden		14
8	Morgan Lake	United Kingdom		12
9	Ruth Beitia	Spain		11
10	Mirela Demireva	Bulgaria		10
11	Oksana Okuneva	Ukraine		6
12	Michaela Hrubá	Czech Republic		5
13	Marusa Cernjul	Slovenia		5
14	Levern Spencer	Saint Lucia		4 *
15	Alyxandria Treasure	Canada		3
16	Chaunté Lowe	United States		2
17	Erika Furlani	Italy		1
18	Marie-Laurence Jungfleisch	Germany		1
19	Inika McPherson	United States		1

Top 12 qualified as of right.

Athletes marked with * called up as reserves for Final

Final

Rank	Name	Nationality	Mark	Notes
	Mariya Lasitskene	Authorised Neutral Athletes	2.02	
2	Yuliya Levchenko	Ukraine	1.94	
3	Michaela Hrubá	Czech Republic	1.88	
4	Nafissatou Thiam	Belgium	1.88	
5	Kamila Lićwinko	Poland	1.88	
6	Sofie Skoog	Sweden	1.84	
7	Levern Spencer	Saint Lucia	1.84	
8	Mirela Demireva	Bulgaria	1.84	
9	Morgan Lake	United Kingdom	1.84	
10	Oksana Okuneva	Ukraine	1.84	
11	Erika Kinsey	Sweden	1.80	
12	Alessia Trost	Italy	1.80	

==== Pole Vault ====
Qualification

Rank	Name	Nationality	Wins	Points
1	Yarisley Silva	Cuba	1	34
2	Katerina Stefanidi	Greece	4	32
3	Sandi Morris	United States		20
4	Lisa Ryzih	Germany		18
5	Anzhelika Sidorova	Authorised Neutral Athletes		17
6	Nicole Büchler	Switzerland	1	17
7	Holly Bradshaw	United Kingdom		17
8	Michaela Meijer	Sweden		15
9	Angelica Bengtsson	Sweden		12
10	Robeilys Peinado	Venezuela		8
11	Katie Nageotte	United States		8
12	Eliza McCartney	New Zealand		7
13	Alysha Newman	Canada		7 *
14	Mary Saxer	United States		4 *
15	Maryna Kylypko	Ukraine		2
16	Kristen Brown	United States		2

Top 12 qualified as of right.

Athletes marked with * called up as reserves for Final

Final

Rank	Name	Nationality	Mark	Notes
	Katerina Stefanidi	Greece	4.85	
2	Sandi Morris	United States	4.75	
3	Alysha Newman	Canada	4.75	=NR
4	Katie Nageotte	United States	4.65	
5	Nicole Büchler	Switzerland	4.65	
6	Holly Bradshaw	United Kingdom	4.55	
7	Lisa Ryzih	Germany	4.55	
8	Michaela Meijer	Sweden	4.55	
9	Yarisley Silva	Cuba	4.55	
10	Mary Saxer	United States	4.45	
11	Anzhelika Sidorova	Authorised Neutral Athletes	4.45	
12	Fanny Smets	Belgium	4.45	

==== Long Jump ====
Qualification

Rank	Name	Nationality	Wins	Points
1	Tianna Bartoletta	United States	2	29
2	Darya Klishina	Authorised Neutral Athletes		17
3	Lorraine Ugen	United Kingdom		16
4	Ivana Spanovic	Serbia	1	15
5	Shakeela Saunders	United States		9
6	Shara Proctor	United Kingdom		9
7	Brittney Reese	United States	1	8
8	Claudia Salman	Germany		7
9	Brooke Stratton	Australia		6
10	Christabel Nettey	Canada		6
11	Katarina Johnson-Thompson	United Kingdom		5
12	Blessing Okagbare	Nigeria		5
13	Melanie Bauschke	Germany		4
14	Laura Strati	Italy		3
15	Concepción Montaner	Spain		2
16	Nadia Assa	Norway		1

Final

Rank	Name	Nationality	Mark	Notes
	Ivana Spanovic	Serbia	6.70	
2	Lorraine Ugen	United Kingdom	6.65	
3	Shakeela Saunders	United States	6.64	
4	Tianna Bartoletta	United States	6.63	
5	Brittney Reese	United States	6.61	
6	Shara Proctor	United Kingdom	6.50	
7	Darya Klishina	Authorised Neutral Athletes	6.49	
8	Claudia Salman	Germany	6.21	

==== Triple Jump ====
Qualification

Rank	Name	Nationality	Wins	Points
1	Caterine Ibargüen	Colombia	3	31
2	Kimberly Williams	Jamaica		24
3	Olga Rypakova	Kazakhstan		20
4	Yulimar Rojas	Venezuela	1	17
5	Patrícia Mamona	Portugal		14
6	Paraskevi Papachristou	Greece		6
7	Hanna Knyazyeva-Minenko	Israel		5
8	Elena Panțuroiu	Romania		4
9	Gabriela Petrova	Bulgaria		4
10	Anna Jagaciak-Michalska	Poland		4 *
11	Liadagmis Povea	Cuba		3
12	Shanieka Ricketts	Jamaica		3
13	Dariya Derkach	Italy		2
14	Jeanine Assani Issouf	France		2
15	Nubia Aparecida Soares	Brazil		2
16	Kristin Gierisch	Germany		1
17	Rouguy Diallo	France		1
18	Andrea Geubelle	United States		1

Top 8 qualified as of right.

Athletes marked with * called up as reserves for Final

Final

Rank	Name	Nationality	Mark	Notes
	Olga Rypakova	Kazakhstan	14.55	
2	Yulimar Rojas	Venezuela	14.52	
3	Caterine Ibargüen	Colombia	14.48	
4	Kimberly Williams	Jamaica	14.41	
5	Hanna Knyazyeva-Minenko	Israel	13.99	
6	Patrícia Mamona	Portugal	13.85	
7	Anna Jagaciak-Michalska	Poland	13.79	
8	Elena Panțuroiu	Romania	13.35	

==== Shot put ====
Qualification

Rank	Name	Nationality	Wins	Points
1	Anita Márton	Hungary		25
2	Lijiao Gong	China	3	24
3	Yuliya Leantsiuk	Belarus		16
4	Aliona Dubitskaya	Belarus		15
5	Michelle Carter	United States	1	14
6	Daniella Bunch	United States		14
7	Brittany Smith	United States		7
8	Ka Bian	China		5
9	Cleopatra Borel	Trinidad and Tobago		5 *
10	Melissa Boekelman	Netherlands		5
11	Paulina Guba	Poland		4
12	Fanny Roos	Sweden		3
13	Noora Salem Jasim	Bahrain		2
14	Felisha Johnson	United States		2
15	Geisa Rafaela Arcanjo	Brazil		2
16	Brittany Crew	Canada		1

Top 8 qualified as of right.

Athletes marked with * called up as reserves for Final

Final

Rank	Name	Nationality	Mark	Notes
	Lijiao Gong	China	19.60	
2	Anita Márton	Hungary	18.54	
3	Yuliya Leantsiuk	Belarus	18.47	SB
4	Michelle Carter	United States	18.27	
5	Daniella Bunch	United States	18.20	
6	Aliona Dubitskaya	Belarus	18.02	
7	Cleopatra Borel	Trinidad and Tobago	17.85	
8	Brittany Smith	United States	16.13	

==== Discus Throw ====
Qualification

Rank	Name	Nationality	Wins	Points
1	Sandra Perković	Croatia	3	31
2	Yaime Pérez	Cuba	1	25
3	Denia Caballero	Cuba		23
4	Nadine Müller	Germany		18
5	Mélina Robert-Michon	France		13
6	Dani Stevens	Australia		12
7	Julia Harting	Germany		8
8	Whitney Ashley	United States		4
9	Xinyue Su	China		3
10	Gia Lewis-Smallwood	United States		1

Final

Rank	Name	Nationality	Mark	Notes
	Sandra Perković	Croatia	68.82	
2	Dani Stevens	Australia	65.85	
3	Denia Caballero	Cuba	64.61	
4	Nadine Müller	Germany	62.85	
5	Mélina Robert-Michon	France	62.49	
6	Whitney Ashley	United States	62.14	
7	Yaime Pérez	Cuba	61.45	
8	Julia Harting	Germany	59.89	

==== Javelin Throw ====
Qualification

Rank	Name	Nationality	Wins	Points
1	Barbora Špotáková	Czech Republic	2	28
2	Sara Kolak	Croatia	1	21
3	Tatsiana Khaladovich	Belarus	1	18
4	Kathryn Mitchell	Australia		13
5	Martina Ratej	Slovenia		13
6	Elizabeth Gleadle	Canada		10
7	Kelsey-Lee Roberts	Australia		9
8	Kara Winger	United States		9
9	Madara Palameika	Latvia		8 *
10	Liu Shiying	China		7
11	Sunette Viljoen	South Africa		3
12	Ásdís Hjálmsdóttir	Iceland		3
13	Katharina Molitor	Germany		1

Top 8 qualified as of right.

Athletes marked with * called up as reserves for Final

Final

Rank	Name	Nationality	Mark	Notes
	Barbora Špotáková	Czech Republic	65.54	
2	Kelsey-Lee Roberts	Australia	64.53	PB
3	Sara Kolak	Croatia	64.47	
4	Tatsiana Khaladovich	Belarus	62.89	
5	Martina Ratej	Slovenia	62.77	
6	Madara Palameika	Latvia	62.60	
7	Kara Winger	United States	62.01	
8	Elizabeth Gleadle	Canada	59.06	
9	Géraldine Ruckstuhl	Switzerland	52.08	
