= Gilbert Kirui =

Kenyan steeplechase runner

Personal information
- Nationality: Kenyan
- Born: January 22, 1994 (age 32)
- Home town: Keringet, Kenya

Sport
- Sport: Athletics
- Event: 3000 metres steeplechase
- College team: Iona Gaels

Achievements and titles
- National finals: 2017 NCAA; 10,000 m, 6th
- Personal bests: 3000m SC: 8:06.96 (2013); 10,000 m: 28:54.90 (2017); Marathon: 2:16:32 (2018)
Medal record
Men's athletics
Representing Kenya
African U20 Championships
Gold medal – first place	2011 Gaborone	3000 m steeplechase
World Youth Championships
Silver medal – second place	2011 Lille	2000 m steeplechase
World U20 Championships
Silver medal – second place	2012 Barcelona	3000 m steeplechase

Gilbert Kiplangat Kirui (born 22 January 1994) is a Kenyan 3000 metre steeplechase runner. In 2011 and 2012, he was a silver medalist at both the World U18 and World U20 championships in the steeplechase.

== Biography ==
Kirui was raised in Keringet, Kenya and attended Chebara Boys High School. In his first major international competition at the 2011 African Junior Athletics Championships, he won the gold medal in the steeplechase with a time of 8:25.03, and he followed that up with another steeplechase silver medal at the 2011 World Youth Championships — losing only to future Olympic gold medalist Conseslus Kipruto.

The next year in 2012, Kipruto and Kirui faced a rematch in the steeplechase at the 2012 World Junior Championships where they again finished 1–2, both more than 10 seconds ahead of the rest of the field.

In 2013, Kirui set his personal best of 8:06.96 at the 2013 London Diamond League, scoring his first Diamond League points as part of the 2013 season.

The following year, Kirui moved to the United States to compete for the Iona Gaels track and field team, which he was a member of from 2014 to 2019. As a Gael, he competed at the NCAA Division I men's cross country championships three times and recorded a sixth-place finish at the 2017 NCAA Division I Outdoor Track and Field Championships in the 10,000 metres.

== Statistics ==
=== Personal bests ===
Event	Mark	Competition	Venue	Date
3000 metres steeplechase	8:06.96	London Diamond League	London, United Kingdom	27 June 2013
