= 2019 Doha Diamond League =

- Dates: 3 May 2019
- Host city: Doha, Qatar
- Venue: Khalifa International Stadium
- Level: 2019 IAAF Diamond League
- Events: 23 (14 Diamond League)

The 2019 Doha Diamond League was the 21st edition of the annual outdoor track and field meeting in Doha, Qatar. Held on 3 May at the Khalifa International Stadium, it was the first leg of the 2019 IAAF Diamond League – the highest level international track and field circuit.

A total of eight world-leading performances were set at the competition, three of which were also meeting records. Daniel Ståhl of Sweden gave the highlight of the meeting with six straight discus throws beyond 69.50 m (the first man ever to deliver such as series) including a Diamond League record of 70.56 m. Caster Semenya of South Africa won the women's 800 metres in a meet record of 1:54.98 minutes and American Dalilah Muhammad improved the previous women's 400 metres hurdles record with her time of 53.61 seconds. The other world leaders on the men's side came from Nijel Amos of Botswana (1:44.29 in the 800 m), Kenyan Elijah Manangoi (3:32.21 in the 1500 metres) and Soufiane El Bakkali of Morocco (8:07.22 in the 3000 metres steeplechase). Great Britain's Dina Asher-Smith ran a world leading time of 22.26 to win the women's 200 metres and Kenya's Hellen Obiri overcame Genzebe Dibaba to win the women's 3000 metres in 8:25.60 minutes. The latter was among the highlights of the meet in terms of strength in depth, as it saw eight athletes achieve lifetime bests. The men's shot put also produced high quality performances, with winner Ryan Crouser and runner-up Tom Walsh both going beyond twenty-two metres.

== Diamond League Results ==
Athletes competing in the Diamond League disciplines earned extra compensation and points which went towards qualifying for one of two Diamond League finals (either Zürich or Brussels depending on the discipline). First place earned 8 points, with each step down in place earning one less point than the previous, until no points are awarded in 9th place or lower.

=== Men ===
200 m (+1.3 m/s)
Place	Athlete	Time	Points
1	Ramil Guliyev (TUR)	19.99	8
2	Álex Quiñónez (ECU)	20.19	7
3	Aaron Brown (CAN)	20.20	6
4	Jereem Richards (TTO)	20.21	5
5	Alonso Edward (PAN)	20.56	4
6	Nethaneel Mitchell-Blake (GBR)	20.83	3
7	Leon Reid (IRL)	20.93	2
8	Jaber Hilal Al Mamari (QAT)	21.47 PB	1
9	Owaab Barrow (QAT)	21.55 PB	0

800 m
Place	Athlete	Time	Points
1	Nijel Amos (BOT)	1:44.29 WL	8
2	Emmanuel Korir (KEN)	1:44.50	7
3	Donavan Brazier (USA)	1:44.70	6
4	Abubaker Haydar Abdalla (QAT)	1:44.82	5
5	Jonathan Kitilit (KEN)	1:44.97	4
6	Cornelius Tuwei (KEN)	1:45.39	3
7	Adam Kszczot (POL)	1:45.60	2
8	Wyclife Kinyamal (KEN)	1:45.66	1
9	Álvaro de Arriba (ESP)	1:45.94	0
10	Jamal Hairane (QAT)	1:46.27	0
11	Rabi Mohamoud Mubarak (QAT)	1:46.40 PB	0
12	Ferguson Cheruiyot Rotich (KEN)	1:46.77	0
13	Abdirahman Saeed Hassan (QAT)	1:48.52	0
—	Bram Som (NED)	DNF PM	0

1500 m
Place	Athlete	Time	Points
1	Elijah Manangoi (KEN)	3:32.21 WL	8
2	Timothy Cheruiyot (KEN)	3:32.47	7
3	Bethwell Birgen (KEN)	3:33.12	6
4	Vincent Kibet (KEN)	3:33.21	5
5	Charles Cheboi Simotwo (KEN)	3:33.31	4
6	Ronald Kwemoi (KEN)	3:33.99	3
7	George Meitamei Manangoi (KEN)	3:34.00 PB	2
8	Brahim Kaazouzi (MAR)	3:34.57	1
9	Ryan Gregson (AUS)	3:35.10	0
10	Abdalaati Iguider (MAR)	3:36.28	0
11	Ayanleh Souleiman (DJI)	3:36.35	0
12	Muhand Khamis Saifeldin (QAT)	3:43.62 PB	0
13	Idriss Moussa Youssouf (QAT)	3:50.92	0
—	Jackson Kivuva (KEN)	DNF PM	0
—	Timothy Sein (KEN)	DNF PM	0

3000 m steeplechase
Place	Athlete	Time	Points
1	Soufiane El Bakkali (MAR)	8:07.22 WL	8
2	Hillary Bor (USA)	8:08.41 PB	7
3	Leonard Kipkemoi Bett (KEN)	8:08.61 PB	6
4	Chala Beyo (ETH)	8:10.55	5
5	Abraham Kibiwott (KEN)	8:12.42	4
6	Lawrence Kemboi Kipsang (KEN)	8:13.59 PB	3
7	Nicholas Kiptanui Bett (KEN)	8:16.66	2
8	Benjamin Kigen (KEN)	8:19.57	1
9	Kennedy Njiru (KEN)	8:21.62	0
10	Barnabas Kipyego (KEN)	8:21.67	0
11	Emmanuel Kiprono (KEN)	8:25.35	0
12	Andrew Bayer (USA)	8:27.80	0
13	Hailemariyam Amare (ETH)	8:30.72	0
14	Amos Kirui (KEN)	8:32.35	0
15	Mounaime Sassioui (MAR)	8:43.16	0
16	Yaser Bagharab (QAT)	8:45.83	0
17	Muhyadin Ismail (SOM)	8:50.82	0
—	Wilberforce Chemiat Kones (KEN)	DNF PM	0

Pole vault
Place	Athlete	Mark	Points
1	Sam Kendricks (USA)	5.80 m	8
2	Thiago Braz da Silva (BRA)	5.71 m	7
3	Seito Yamamoto (JPN)	5.61 m	6
4	Piotr Lisek (POL)	5.46 m	5
4	Ernest Obiena (PHI)	5.46 m	5
6	Charlie Myers (GBR)	5.46 m	3
7=	Konstantinos Filippidis (GRE)	5.46 m	2
7=	Bo Kanda Lita Baehre (GER)	5.46 m	2
9	Stanley Joseph (FRA)	5.31 m	0
—	Andrew Irwin (USA)	NM	0

Shot put
Place	Athlete	Mark	Points
1	Ryan Crouser (USA)	22.13 m	8
2	Tomas Walsh (NZL)	22.06 m	7
3	Darlan Romani (BRA)	21.60 m	6
4	Darrell Hill (USA)	21.28 m	5
5	Michał Haratyk (POL)	21.18 m	4
6	Joe Kovacs (USA)	20.83 m	3
7	Tomáš Staněk (CZE)	20.61 m	2
8	Konrad Bukowiecki (POL)	20.46 m	1
9	Meshari Saad Suroor (KUW)	18.07 m	0

Discus throw
Place	Athlete	Mark	Points
1	Daniel Ståhl (SWE)	70.56 m WL DLR MR	8
2	Lukas Weißhaidinger (AUT)	66.90 m	7
3	Ehsan Haddadi (IRI)	66.78 m	6
4	Reggie Jagers III (USA)	64.89 m	5
5	Christoph Harting (GER)	64.49 m	4
6	Piotr Małachowski (POL)	64.45 m	3
7	Mason Finley (USA)	63.52 m	2
8	Ola Stunes Isene (NOR)	62.63 m	1
9	Moaaz Mohamed Ibrahim (QAT)	58.98 m	1

=== Women ===
200 m (+1.1 m/s)
Place	Athlete	Time	Points
1	Dina Asher-Smith (GBR)	22.26 WL	8
2	Jamile Samuel (NED)	22.90	7
3	Blessing Okagbare (NGR)	23.14	6
4	Kyra Jefferson (USA)	23.15	5
5	Ángela Tenorio (ECU)	23.28	4
6	Jeneba Tarmoh (USA)	23.39	3
7	Phyllis Francis (USA)	23.47	2
8	Sarah Atcho (SUI)	23.89	1
—	Shannon Hylton (GBR)	DQ R162.8	1

800 m
Place	Athlete	Time	Points
1	Caster Semenya (RSA)	1:54.98 WL MR	8
2	Francine Niyonsaba (BDI)	1:57.75	7
3	Ajeé Wilson (USA)	1:58.83	6
4	Nelly Jepkosgei (KEN)	1:59.00	5
5	Raevyn Rogers (USA)	1:59.07	4
6	Margaret Wambui (KEN)	2:00.61	3
7	Habitam Alemu (ETH)	2:00.61	2
8	Natoya Goule (JAM)	2:00.96	1
9	Lynsey Sharp (GBR)	2:01.51	0
10	Mahlet Mulugeta (ETH)	2:02.14	0
11	Olha Lyakhova (UKR)	2:03.38	0
—	Noélie Yarigo (BEN)	DNF PM	0

3000 m
Place	Athlete	Time	Points
1	Hellen Obiri (KEN)	8:25.60 WL	8
2	Genzebe Dibaba (ETH)	8:26.20 PB	7
3	Lilian Kasait Rengeruk (KEN)	8:29.02 PB	6
4	Beatrice Chepkoech (KEN)	8:29.83	5
5	Caroline Chepkoech Kipkirui (KEN)	8:29.89	4
6	Gloriah Kite (KEN)	8:29.91	3
7	Gudaf Tsegay (ETH)	8:30.65 PB	2
8	Yasemin Can (TUR)	8:33.29 PB	1
9	Lemlem Hailu (ETH)	8:34.03	0
10	Margaret Chelimo Kipkemboi (KEN)	8:34.65	0
11	Loice Chemnung (KEN)	8:40.08 PB	0
12	Ejgayehu Taye (ETH)	8:40.96 PB	0
13	Hyvin Kiyeng Jepkemoi (KEN)	8:44.59	0
14	Hanna Klein (GER)	8:45.00 PB	0
15	Meskerem Mamo (ETH)	8:48.26	0
16	Beatrice Chebet (KEN)	8:49.05 PB	0
17	Mary Kuria (KEN)	8:49.16 PM	0
18	Eva Cherono (KEN)	8:50.22	0
—	Winny Chebet (KEN)	DNF PM	0

100 m hurdles (+0.9 m/s)
Place	Athlete	Time	Points
1	Danielle Williams (JAM)	12.66	8
2	Tobi Amusan (NGR)	12.73	7
3	Sharika Nelvis (USA)	12.78	6
4	Christina Clemons (USA)	12.83	5
5	Jasmine Camacho-Quinn (PUR)	12.85	4
6	Elvira Herman (BLR)	12.88	3
7	Brianna McNeal (USA)	12.94	2
8	Amber Hughes (USA)	12.97	1
9	Isabelle Pedersen (NOR)	13.26	0

400 m hurdles
Place	Athlete	Mark	Points
1	Dalilah Muhammad (USA)	53.61 WL MR	8
2	Ashley Spencer (USA)	54.72	7
3	Hanna Ryzhykova (UKR)	54.82	6
4	Janieve Russell (JAM)	55.28	5
5	Lauren Wells (AUS)	55.60	4
6	Meghan Beesley (GBR)	56.01	3
7	Wenda Nel (RSA)	56.16	2
8	Zenéy van der Walt (RSA)	56.45	1
9	Yadisleidy Pedroso (ITA)	57.20	0

High jump
Place	Athlete	Mark	Points
1	Yaroslava Mahuchikh (UKR)	1.96 m PB	8
2=	Mirela Demireva (BUL)	1.91 m	7
2=	Erika Kinsey (SWE)	1.91 m	7
2=	Ana Šimić (CRO)	1.91 m	7
5	Levern Spencer (LCA)	1.88 m	4
6	Airinė Palšytė (LTU)	1.88 m	3
7	Elena Vallortigara (ITA)	1.85 m	2
8=	Nicola McDermott (AUS)	1.85 m	1
8=	Svetlana Radzivil (UZB)	1.85 m	1

Long jump
Place	Athlete	Mark	Points
1	Caterine Ibargüen (COL)	6.76 m (+0.5 m/s)	8
2	Maryna Bekh-Romanchuk (UKR)	6.74 m (+0.4 m/s)	7
3	Brooke Stratton (AUS)	6.73 m (+0.1 m/s)	6
4	Lorraine Ugen (GBR)	6.62 m (±0.0 m/s)	5
5	Christabel Nettey (CAN)	6.55 m (−0.1 m/s)	4
6	Naa Anang (AUS)	6.52 m (+0.3 m/s)	3
7	Sha'Keela Saunders (USA)	6.37 m (−0.3 m/s)	2
8	Shara Proctor (GBR)	6.35 m (+0.3 m/s)	1
9	Tianna Bartoletta (USA)	5.92 m (−0.1 m/s)	0

== Qatari national results ==
=== Men ===
Event	First		Second		Third	
400 m	Bassem Humaida	45.88	Emmanuel Bamidele	45.99	Abdulaziz Salem	47.30
800 m	Mohamed Al Radei	1:52.61	Mouhyadin Ducale	1:54.10	Achmed Rahmataalah	1:56.59

=== Boys ===
Event	First		Second		Third	
60 m	Falah Zamzoum	8.02	Said Al-Kaabi	8.07	Soltan Al-Nubi	8.34
100 m (−0.2 m/s)	Khaled Zakariya	10.94	Mohamed Al-Rael	11.06	Said Zamzoum	11.10
4×100 m relay	Tunisian School	45.35	Mes Indian School	45.65	American School	47.61
Medley relay	Al-Rayyan Club	2:05.13	Qatar Club	2:07.64	Al-Saad Club	2:08.60

=== Girls ===
Event	First		Second		Third	
100 m (−0.3 m/s)	Christina Amoah	13.03	Kinda Moussa	13.05	Naa Torto	13.42
4×100 m relay	Mesaieed International School	52.80	Newton International School	56.11	American School	56.93

=== Mixed ===
Event	First		Second		Third	
4×100 m relay	American School	47.95	Aspire Academy	48.00	Sherborne International School	49.29

== See also ==
- 2019 Diamond League Shanghai (next Diamond League event)
- 2019 Weltklasse Zürich (first half of the Diamond League final)
- 2019 Memorial Van Damme (second half of the Diamond League final)
