= Hadel Aboud =

Libyan sprinter (born 1999)

Personal information
- Nationality: Libyan
- Born: 21 October 1999 (age 26)

Sport
- Sport: Athletics
- Event: 100 metres
Medal record
Women's athletics
Representing Libya
Arab U20 Championships
Bronze medal – third place	2018 Amman	100 m
Bronze medal – third place	2018 Amman	Long jump

Hadel Fathy Aboud (Arabic: هديل عبود; born 21 October 1999) is a Libyan athlete. She competed in the women's 100 metres event at the 2020 Summer Olympics.

== Career ==
Aboud won the bronze medals in the 100 metres and long jump at the 2018 Arab Junior Athletics Championships. Her marks of 12.60 seconds and 5.47 metres respectively were both Libyan national records. Her long jump record broke the previous mark she had set in Tripoli by 4 centimetres.

At the 2019 African Games, Aboud finished 16th in the long jump in 5.42 metres. She was disqualified from her 100 metres heat.

Aboud was seeded in the first preliminary 100 metres round at the 2021 Olympics. She ran 12.70 seconds to place 5th in her heat and did not advance.

== Personal life ==
She is coached by Fathi Aboud and managed by Walid Embarek.
