= Zakaria Kiprotich =

Ugandan runner (born 1994)

Personal information
- Nationality: Uganda
- Born: 28 February 1994 (age 32)
Medal record
Men's athletics
Representing Uganda
Youth Olympic Games
Bronze medal – third place	2010 Singapore	2000 metre steeplechase
World Youth Championships in Athletics
Bronze medal – third place	2011 Lille	2000 metre steeplechase

Zakaria Kiprotich (born 28 February 1994) is a Ugandan middle-distance runner. He won bronze in the 2000 metre steeplechase at the 2010 Youth Olympics. He was the only medalist for Uganda at the games and the first Ugandan to win a medal at the Youth Olympics.

He won bronze at the 2011 World U18 Championships in the 2000 meter steeplechase.
