= Ethiopia at the 2010 Summer Youth Olympics =

- IOC code: ETH
- NOC: Ethiopian Olympic Committee

in Singapore
- Competitors: 7 in 2 sports
- Flag bearer: Tizita Ashame
- Medals Ranked 22nd: Gold 2 Silver 3 Bronze 0 Total 5

Summer Youth Olympics appearances
- 2010; 2014; 2018

Ethiopia participated in the 2010 Summer Youth Olympics in Singapore.

== Medalists ==
Medal	Name	Sport	Event	Date
Gold	Mohammed Geleto	Athletics	Boys' 1000m	22 Aug
Gold	Tizita Ashame	Athletics	Girls' 1000m	23 Aug
Silver	Fekru Jebesa	Athletics	Boys' 3000m	22 Aug
Silver	Habtamu Fayisa	Athletics	Boys' 2000m Steeplechase	23 Aug
Silver	Tsehynesh Tsenga	Athletics	Girls' 2000m Steeplechase	23 Aug

== Athletics ==
=== Boys ===
Track and Road Events

Athletes	Event	Qualification		Final	
Athletes	Event	Result	Rank	Result	Rank
Mohammed Geleto	Boys’ 1000m	2:24.40	1 Q	2:19.54	Gold medal
Fekru Jebesa	Boys’ 3000m	8:12.65	1 Q	8:08.53	Silver medal
Habtamu Fayisa	Boys’ 2000m Steeplechase	5:38.62	1 Q	5:39.10	Silver medal

=== Girls ===
Track and Road Events

Athletes	Event	Qualification		Final	
Athletes	Event	Result	Rank	Result	Rank
Tizita Ashame	Girls’ 1000m	2:46.34	4 Q	2:43.24	Gold medal
Tsehynesh Tsenga	Girls’ 2000m Steeplechase	6:46.08	2 Q	6:37.81	Silver medal

== Swimming ==
Athletes	Event	Heat		Semifinal		Final	
Athletes	Event	Time	Position	Time	Position	Time	Position
Robel Habte	Boys’ 50m Freestyle	28.44	42	Did not advance			
Robel Habte	Boys’ 50m Butterfly	32.30	21	Did not advance			
Yanet Gebremedhin	Girls’ 50m Freestyle	34.84	58	Did not advance			
Yanet Gebremedhin	Girls’ 50m Backstroke	38.96	21	Did not advance			
