= Athletics at the 2010 Summer Youth Olympics – Girls' 2000 metre steeplechase =

Athletics – Girls' 2000 metres steeplechase at the I Summer Youth Olympic Games
- Venue: Bishan Stadium
- Date: August 18–23
- Competitors: 15 from 15 nations

Medalists
1st place, gold medalist(s)		Virginia Nyambura	Kenya
2nd place, silver medalist(s)		Tsehynesh Tsenga	Ethiopia
3rd place, bronze medalist(s)		Oksana Raita	Ukraine

The girls' 2,000 metres steeplechase event at the 2010 Youth Olympic Games was held on 18–23 August 2010 in Bishan Stadium.

== Schedule ==
Date	Time	Round
18 August 2010	10:00	Heats
23 August 2010	09:25	Final

== Results ==
=== Heats ===
Rank	Athlete	Time	Notes	Q
1	Virginia Nyambura (KEN)	6:42.40		FA
2	Tsehynesh Tsenga (ETH)	6:46.08		FA
3	Oksana Raita (UKR)	6:52.36		FA
4	Li Lijiao (CHN)	6:54.70	PB	FA
5	Doina Cravcenco (MDA)	6:59.88		FA
6	July da Silva (BRA)	7:01.84	PB	FA
7	Anastasiya Puzakova (BLR)	7:03.02		FA
8	Nour Sioud (TUN)	7:04.61	PB	FA
9	Nina Habold (FRA)	7:05.25		FB
10	Katelyn Hayward (CAN)	7:05.71		FB
11	Katarzyna Dulak (POL)	7:09.75		FB
12	Ouafa Tijani (MAR)	7:17.77		FB
13	Dana Loghin (ROU)	7:26.53		FB
14	Nabila Madoui (ALG)	7:29.32		FB
15	Jenna Hansen (NZL)	8:11.91		FB

=== Finals ===
==== Final B ====
Rank	Athlete	Time	Notes
1	Nina Habold (FRA)	6:51.05	PB
2	Ouafa Tijani (MAR)	6:54.10	PB
3	Katarzyna Dulak (POL)	7:00.64	
4	Katelyn Hayward (CAN)	7:05.75	
5	Dana Loghin (ROU)	7:08.51	
6	Nabila Madoui (ALG)	7:14.34	
7	Jenna Hansen (NZL)	8:03.65	

==== Final A ====
Rank	Athlete	Time	Notes
1st place, gold medalist(s)	Virginia Nyambura (KEN)	6:29.97	PB
2nd place, silver medalist(s)	Tsehynesh Tsenga (ETH)	6:37.81	
3rd place, bronze medalist(s)	Oksana Raita (UKR)	6:41.49	PB
4	Li Lijiao (CHN)	6:55.20	
5	Doina Cravcenco (MDA)	6:55.20	PB
6	July da Silva (BRA)	6:56.00	
7	Anastasiya Puzakova (BLR)	7:55.18	
	Nour Sioud (TUN)	DNF	
