= Uganda at the 2010 Summer Youth Olympics =

- IOC code: UGA
- NOC: Uganda Olympic Committee
- Website: www.nocuganda.com

in Singapore
- Competitors: 6 in 4 sports
- Flag bearer: Halima Nakayi
- Medals Ranked 84th: Gold 0 Silver 0 Bronze 1 Total 1

Summer Youth Olympics appearances
- 2010; 2014; 2018

Uganda participated in the 2010 Summer Youth Olympics in Singapore.

== Medalists ==
Medal	Name	Sport	Event	Date
Bronze	Zakaria Kiprotich	Athletics	Boys' 2000m Steeplechase	23 Aug

== Athletics ==
=== Boys ===
Track and Road Events

Athletes	Event	Qualification		Final	
Athletes	Event	Result	Rank	Result	Rank
Alex Cherop	Boys’ 3000m	8:14.97	8 Q	8:13.11	7
Zakaria Kiprotich	Boys’ 2000m Steeplechase	5:44.51	3 Q	5:41.25	Bronze medal

=== Girls ===
Track and Road Events

Athletes	Event	Qualification		Final	
Athletes	Event	Result	Rank	Result	Rank
Halima Nakayi	Girls’ 400m	DSQ qD		DSQ	

== Badminton ==
Girls

Athlete	Event	Group Stage				Knock-Out Stage			
Athlete	Event	Match 1	Match 2	Match 3	Rank	Quarterfinal	Semifinal	Final	Rank
Bridget Shamim Bangi	Girls’ Singles	Deprez (GER) L 0-2 (10-21, 16-21)	Clausen (DEN) L 0-2 (8-21, 7-21)	Rasheed (MDV) W 2-1 (19-21, 21-8, 21-12)	3	Did not advance			

== Swimming ==
Athletes	Event	Heat		Semifinal		Final	
Athletes	Event	Time	Position	Time	Position	Time	Position
Ham Sserunjogi	Boys’ 50m Butterfly	31.07	20	Did not advance			
Ham Sserunjogi	Boys’ 100m Butterfly	1:11.23	34	Did not advance			

== Weightlifting ==
Athlete	Event	Snatch	Clean & Jerk	Total	Rank
Charles Ssekyaaya	Boys' 62kg	101	136	237	7
