= Peter Matheka Mutuku =

Kenyan runner (1994–2014)

Personal information
- Nationality: Kenya
- Born: 12 January 1994
- Died: 10 July 2014 (aged 20) Machakos, Kenya
Medal record
Men's athletics
Representing Kenya
Youth Olympic Games
Gold medal – first place	2010 Singapore	2000 metre steeplechase

Peter Matheka Mutuku (12 January 1994 – 10 July 2014) was a Kenyan runner who won gold in the 2000 metre steeplechase at the 2010 Youth Olympics.

Mutuku died in 2014 in a car crash near Machakos in Kenya.
