= Jaber Al-Mamari =

Qatari sprinter

Jaber Al Mamari
Personal information
- Full name: Jaber Hilal Al Mamari; Jabr Hilal Rached
- Nationality: Qatar
- Born: 15 August 2001 (age 24)

Sport
- Sport: Athletics
- Event(s): 100 metres, 200 metres
- Club: Aspire Academy

Achievements and titles
- Personal bests: 100m: 10.67 (+1.2) (2019); 200m: 20.97 NWI (2019)
Medal record
Men's athletics
Representing Qatar
Arab Junior Championships
Bronze medal – third place	2018 Amman	200 m

Jaber Hilal Al-Mamari (born 15 August 2001), also known as Jabr Hilal Rached, is a Qatari sprinter. He was the bronze medalist at the 2018 Arab Junior Athletics Championships in the 200 metres.

== Biography ==
Al Mamari began his athletics career in Australia, winning the Australian Capital Territory championships and qualifying for the semi-finals of the 2018 New South Wales championships in the 100 m. At the 2018 Arab Junior Athletics Championships, Al Mamari finished 5th in the 100 m and won a bronze medal in the 200 m. Later in the season, Al Mamari was a member of the Qatari 4 × 100 m team at the 2018 Asian Games and the World U20 Championships, finishing last place at both events.

In 2019, Al Mamari was selected to compete in the 2019 Doha Diamond League, along with Owaab Barrow in the men's 200 m. He finished 8th, beating his compatriot and scoring one point in the 2019 Diamond League season. At the 2019 Asian Athletics Championships, Al Mamari competed in the 100 m, 200 m, and 4 × 100 m, with a best finish in the 200 m where he advanced past the first round and finished 5th in the first semifinal but did not qualify for the finals.

Al Mamari is a student athlete for Aspire Academy.

== Statistics ==
=== Personal bests ===
Event	Mark	Competition	Venue	Date
100 metres	10.67 (+1.2 m/s)	Asian Athletics Championships	Doha, Qatar	22 April 2019
200 metres	20.97 NWI	Emir Cup Clubs Championships	Doha, Qatar	9 April 2019
