= Hicham Sigueni =

Moroccan long-distance runner

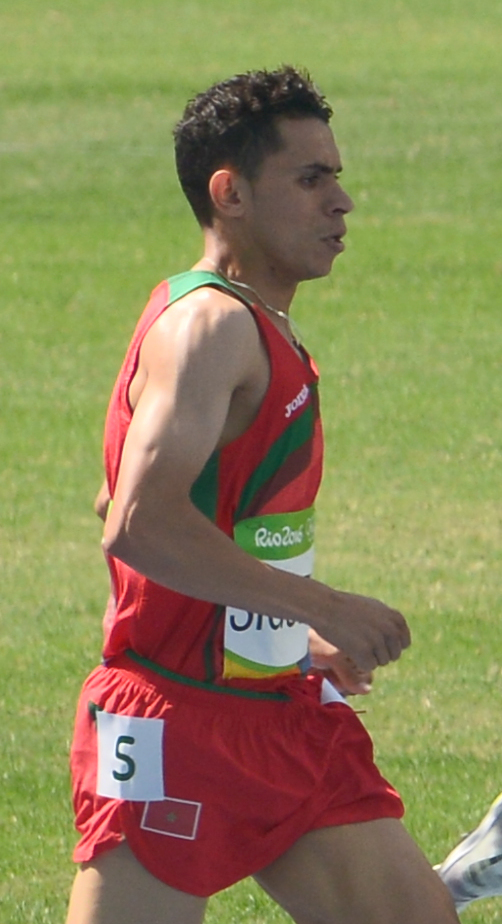
- Sigueni at the 2016 Olympics

Personal information
- Born: 30 January 1993 (age 33) Beni Mellal, Morocco
- Education: Mohammed V University at Souissi
- Height: 1.72 m (5 ft 8 in)
- Weight: 61 kg (134 lb)

Sport
- Sport: Track and field
- Events: 3000 m, steeplechase

Achievements and titles
- Personal bests: 3000 m – 7:50.23 (2013); 3000 mS – 8:16.54 (2015)
Medal record
Representing Morocco
World Junior Championships
Bronze medal – third place	2012 Barcelona	3000 m s'chase
Summer Youth Olympics
Bronze medal – third place	2010 Singapore	3000 m

Hicham Sigueni (also spelled Seguini, Arabic: هشام سڭني; born 30 January 1993) is a Moroccan long-distance runner who specialises in the 3000 metres steeplechase. He competed at the 2012 and 2016 Olympics, but failed to reach the finals. Sigueni has won bronze medals in major junior competitions, at the 2012 World Junior Championships and the 2010 Summer Youth Olympics.

== Competition record ==
Year	Competition	Venue	Position	Event	Notes
Representing Morocco
2009	World Youth Championships	Brixen, Italy	4th	3000 m	8:12.88
2010	World Junior Championships	Moncton, Canada	–	5000 m	DNF
2010	Youth Olympic Games	Singapore	3rd	3000 m	8:08.55
2011	Arab Championships	Al Ain, United Arab Emirates	3rd	5000 m	15:38.15
2011	Pan Arab Games	Doha, Qatar	9th	1500 m	3:42.21
2012	World Junior Championships	Barcelona, Spain	3rd	3000 m s'chase	8:30.14
2012	Olympic Games	London, United Kingdom	26th (h)	3000 m s'chase	8:35.89
2015	World Championships	Beijing, China	25th (h)	3000 m s'chase	8:49.73
2016	Olympic Games	Rio de Janeiro, Brazil	16th (h)	3000 m s'chase	8:27.82
2017	Jeux de la Francophonie	Abidjan, Ivory Coast	2nd	3000 m s'chase	8:45.27
2017	World Championships	London, United Kingdom	36th (h)	3000 m s'chase	8:44.74
2018	African Championships	Asaba, Nigeria	10th	3000 m s'chase	8:47.02

== Personal bests ==
Outdoor

- 800 metres – 1:49.11 (Gaborone 2011)
- 1500 metres – 3:38.41 (Marrakesh 2012)
- 3000 metres – 7:50.23 (Rehlingen 2013)
- 5000 metres – 13:26.32 (Rabat 2011)
- 3000 metres steeplechase – 8:16.54 (Stockholm 2015)

Indoor

- 3000 metres – 7:52.24 (Istanbul 2017)
