= Athletics at the 2010 Summer Youth Olympics – Boys' 2000 metre steeplechase =

Athletics – Boys' 2000 metres steeplechase at the I Summer Youth Olympic Games
- Venue: Bishan Stadium
- Date: August 18–23
- Competitors: 15 from 15 nations

Medalists
1st place, gold medalist(s)		Peter Matheka Mutuku	Kenya
2nd place, silver medalist(s)		Habtamu Fayisa	Ethiopia
3rd place, bronze medalist(s)		Zakaria Kiprotich	Uganda

The boys' 2,000 metres steeplechase competition at the 2010 Youth Olympic Games was held on 18–23 August 2010 in Bishan Stadium.

== Schedule ==
Date	Time	Round
18 August 2010	09:40	Heats
23 August 2010	09:45	Final

== Results ==
=== Heats ===
Rank	Athlete	Time	Notes	Q
1	Habtamu Fayisa (ETH)	5:38.62	PB	FA
2	Peter Matheka Mutuku (KEN)	5:38.72	PB	FA
3	Zakaria Kiprotich (UGA)	5:44.51	PB	FA
4	Waleed Elayah (YEM)	5:51.58	PB	FA
5	Bilal Tabti (ALG)	5:56.21	PB	FA
6	Yousif Daifalla (SUD)	5:56.46	PB	FA
7	Salem Attiatalla (EGY)	6:03.41		FA
8	Daniel Wong (USA)	6:05.92	PB	FA
9	David Morcillo (ESP)	6:10.90		FB
10	Laurentiu Rosu (ROU)	6:12.77		FB
11	Grant Gwynne (AUS)	6:16.83		FB
12	Ioran Etchechury (BRA)	6:39.87		FB
13	Bacem Salhi (TUN)	6:43.17		FB
	Ahmed Burhan (KSA)	DSQ		FB
	Zak Seddon (GBR)	DSQ		FB

=== Finals ===
==== Final B ====
Rank	Athlete	Time	Notes
1	Ahmed Burhan (KSA)	5:48.81	PB
2	Zak Seddon (GBR)	5:52.13	PB
3	David Morcillo (ESP)	5:57.52	PB
4	Grant Gwynne (AUS)	6:18.41	
5	Laurentiu Rosu (ROU)	6:25.15	
6	Bacem Salhi (TUN)	6:39.07	
	Ioran Etchechury (BRA)	DNS	

==== Final A ====
Rank	Athlete	Time	Notes
1st place, gold medalist(s)	Peter Matheka Mutuku (KEN)	5:37.63	PB
2nd place, silver medalist(s)	Habtamu Fayisa (ETH)	5:39.10	
3rd place, bronze medalist(s)	Zakaria Kiprotich (UGA)	5:41.25	PB
4	Bilal Tabti (ALG)	5:44.34	PB
5	Yousif Daifalla (SUD)	5:45.84	PB
6	Waleed Elayah (YEM)	5:45.87	PB
7	Salem Attiatalla (EGY)	5:49.03	
8	Daniel Wong (USA)	5:57.29	PB
