= Dalilah Muhammad =

American hurdler (born 1990)

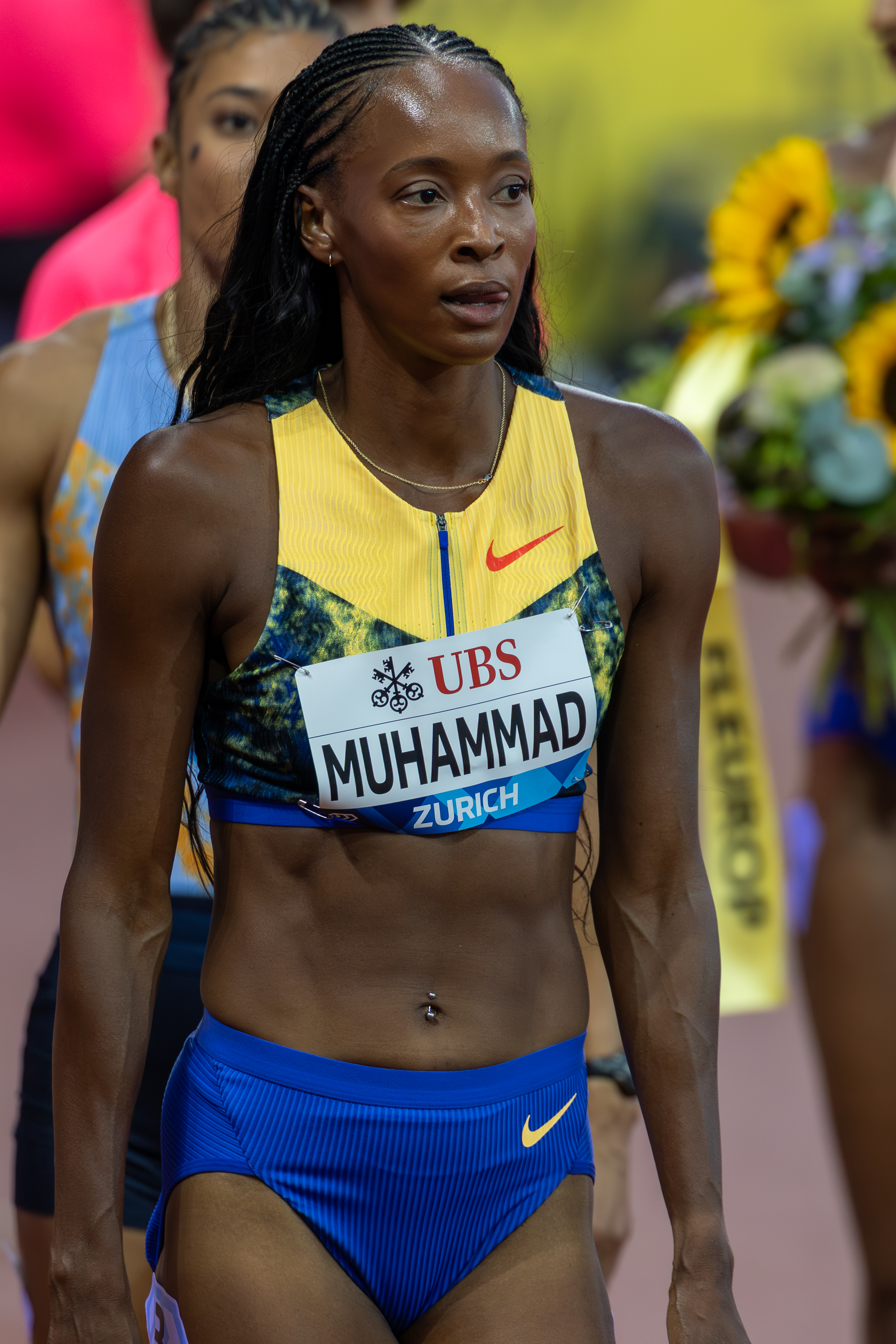
- Dalilah Muhammad at the 2026 Weltklasse Zürich.

Personal information
- Nationality: American
- Born: February 7, 1990 (age 36) Jamaica, Queens, New York, U.S.
- Home town: Rochdale Village, Queens, New York, U.S.
- Education: Benjamin N. Cardozo High School; University of Southern California
- Height: 5 ft 8 in (173 cm)
- Weight: 121 lb (55 kg)

Sport
- Country: United States
- Sport: Athletics (track and field)
- Event: 400 m hurdles

Achievements and titles
- Olympic finals: 2016 Rio de Janeiro; 400 m hurdles, Gold; 2020 Tokyo; 400 m hurdles, Silver; 4 × 400 m relay, Gold
- World finals: 2013 Moscow; 400 m hurdles, Silver; 2017 London; 400 m hurdles, Silver; 2019 Doha; 400 m hurdles, Gold; 4 × 400 m relay, Gold; 2022 Eugene; 400 m hurdles, Bronze
Medal record
Women's athletics
Representing the United States
Olympic Games
Gold medal – first place	2016 Rio de Janeiro	400 m hurdles
Gold medal – first place	2020 Tokyo	4 × 400 m relay
Silver medal – second place	2020 Tokyo	400 m hurdles
World Championships
Gold medal – first place	2019 Doha	400 m hurdles
Gold medal – first place	2019 Doha	4 × 400 m relay
Silver medal – second place	2013 Moscow	400 m hurdles
Silver medal – second place	2017 London	400 m hurdles
Bronze medal – third place	2022 Eugene	400 m hurdles
Diamond League
First place	2017	400 m hurdles
First place	2018	400 m hurdles
World Youth Championships
Gold medal – first place	2007 Ostrava	400 m hurdles
Gold medal – first place	2007 Ostrava	Medley relay
Pan American Junior Championships
Silver medal – second place	2009 Port of Spain	400 m hurdles

Dalilah Muhammad (born February 7, 1990) is a retired American track and field athlete who specialised in the 400 meters hurdles. She is the 2016 Rio Olympic champion and 2020 Tokyo Olympics silver medalist, becoming at the latter the then-second-fastest woman of all time in the event with her personal best of 51.58 seconds.

Muhammad was second at both the 2013 and 2017 World Championships before taking her first World Championship gold in 2019, setting the former world record of 52.16 s. She also won a bronze medal in 2022. She was the second female 400 m hurdler in history, after Sally Gunnell, to have won the Olympic, World titles and broken the world record. At both the 2019 World Championships and Tokyo Games, she also took gold as part of women's 4 × 400 metres relay team. In 2019, she was named the Female Athlete of the Year by World Athletics.

Muhammad won the 400 m hurdles at the 2007 World Youth Championships, and placed second in the event at the 2009 Pan American Junior Championships. Collegiately, she ran for the USC Trojans, for whom she was a four-time All-American at the NCAA Outdoor Championships. She also won the American title in 2013, 2016, 2017, 2019 and 2025 whilst also becoming the Diamond League champion in 2017 and 2018. She first broke the 400 m hurdles world record at the 2019 US Championships with a time of 52.20 s, before surpassing that time by running 52.16 s later that year.

== Early life ==
Dalilah Muhammad was born February 7, 1990, in Jamaica, Queens, New York City, to parents Nadirah and Askia Muhammad. She has two siblings, a brother named Hassan and a sister named Jamillah.

She began her athletic career at age seven when a local coach saw her running through the streets and encouraged Muhammad's mother to allow her to join a club.

== Athletic career ==
=== High school and college track ===
Dalilah Muhammad competed in various track and field events at high school, including the hurdles, sprints, and high jump. While at Benjamin N. Cardozo High School in Bayside, Queens, she won the 2008 New York State and Nike Outdoor Nationals titles in the 400 m hurdles. During that period, she also gained her first international experience. At the 2007 World Youth Championships in Athletics, she took the 400 m hurdles gold medal. Muhammad earned 2007 Gatorade Female Athlete of the Year for New York State.

In 2008, she enrolled at the University of Southern California on a sports scholarship, majoring in business. Joining the USC Trojans track team, she competed extensively in her first season. At the Pacific-10 Conference meet, she was runner-up in the 400 m hurdles, fourth in the 4 × 400-meter relay, and also set a personal record of 13.79 seconds as a finalist in the 100-meter hurdles. The NCAA Outdoor Championship saw her set a 400 m hurdles best of 56.49 seconds and finish in third place in the final. She won the national junior title that year and was the silver medallist at the 2009 Pan American Junior Athletics Championships. In her second year at USC, she was a runner-up at the Pac-10 championships but narrowly missed out on the NCAA final. The 2011 outdoor season saw her repeat her Pac-10-second place, and a personal record of 56.04 seconds in the NCAA semi-finals led to a sixth-place finish in the 400 m hurdles final.

In 2012, she set personal records in the sprint hurdles events, running 8.23 seconds for the 60-meter hurdles and 13.33 seconds for the 100 m hurdles. She ranked fifth in the latter event at the Pac-12 meet, where she placed third in the 400 m hurdles. She was again an NCAA finalist in her speciality, coming in fifth, and she also participated in the heats at the 2012 United States Olympic Trials. She ended her career as a USC Trojan athlete as the school's third fastest ever 400 m hurdler and a four-time NCAA All-American.

=== Professional ===
==== 2013: US 400mH champion and world silver medallist ====
After graduating from USC, Muhammad chose to compete professionally in the 400 m hurdles. In March of that year, she improved her personal best to 55.97 s in winning the Pasadena Games in California. She further improved her personal best by over a second at the Irvine Steve Scott Invitational, running 54.94 s on 28 April. She made her Diamond League debut on 18 May, finishing fourth in Shanghai, in another personal best of 54.74 s. She finished third at the Bislett Games on 13 June, further improving her personal best to 54.33.

At the USA Championships, Muhammad improved her personal best by half a second with a run of 53.83 in the final to win her first national title in the 400 m hurdles. In August, at the World Championships held in Moscow, she won the silver medal, running a time of 54.09 s to finish behind Zuzana Hejnova and claim her first senior global medal.

==== 2014-2017: Olympic champion ====
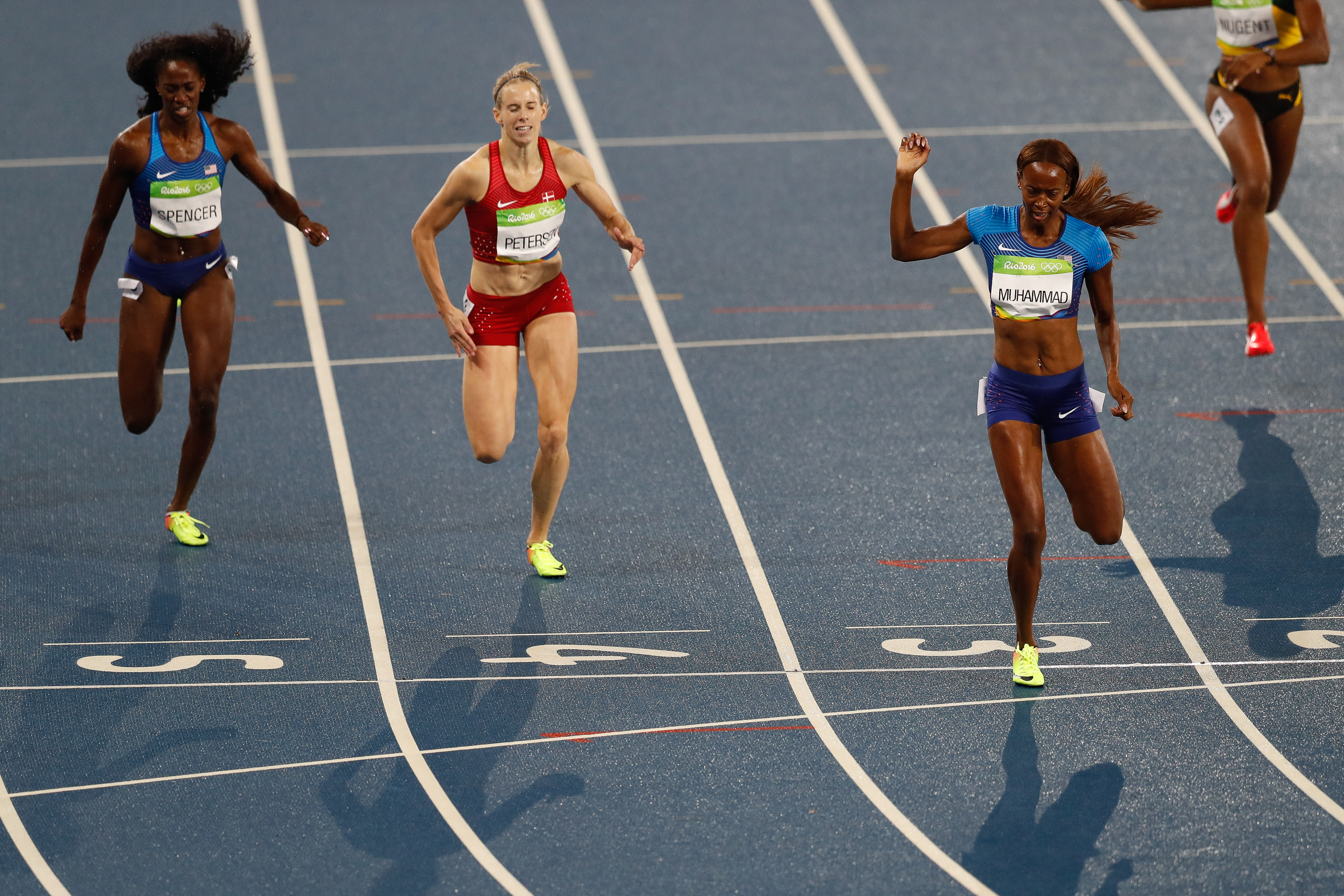
Muhammad (right) winning final of the 2016 Rio Olympics.

After not competing frequently in 2014 and 2015 due to consistent injuries, Muhammad made a comeback in 2016. On 5 June 2016, she finished fourth at the Birmingham Diamond League, running a time of 54.75 s. On 7 June, she won at the Montreuil International in a time of 54.37. At the 2016 US Olympic Trials, Muhammad won in a major personal best of 52.88, making her the 5th fastest American ever in the event and 12th fastest overall. Her time was also a US Championship record. At the Olympics in Rio de Janeiro, Muhammad won gold in the 400 m hurdles, becoming the first American woman to do so. She ended her season by winning the Lausanne Diamond League in a time of 53.78 s.

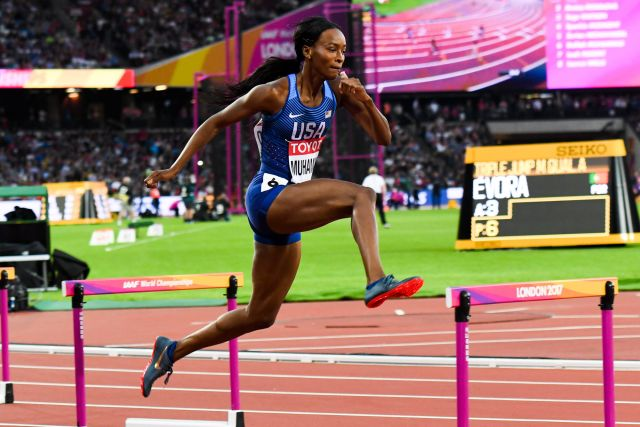
Muhammad competing at the 2017 World Championships.

The following year, Muhammad ran a new personal best of 52.64 s to win at the US Championships, her time was a new North American all-comers record. At the World Championships in London, she won the silver medal behind her American compatriot Kori Carter. Carter's win over Muhammad was widely seen as an upset win, especially as Carter was racing from the unfavourable lane 9.

==== 2018-2019: World champion and world record holder ====
On 12 May, Muhammad competed in her first Diamond League of the season, winning in Shanghai, in a time of 53.77 s. She finished second at the Prefontaine Classic, running 54.09 s to narrowly finish behind Janieve Russell, who ran 54.06 s. She returned to winning ways on 7 June, as she won at the Bislett Games in a season's best of 53.65 s. On 9 July, Muhammad finished second at the Spitzen Leichtathletik Luzern in 53.79, behind Russell who ran a meeting record of 53.63 s. At the Diamond League Final in Zurich, she won the Diamond League title in 53.88 s.

In 2019, Muhammad ran her first 400 m hurdles race on 3 May, winning at the Doha Diamond League in 53.61 s. She also won at the Rome Diamond League on 6 June, running 53.67 s. On 16 June, she set a major personal best over the flat 400 m, running a time of 50.60 s, to take over a second off of her previous personal best of 51.62 s. Muhammad broke the 400-meter hurdles world record at the US Championships with a time of 52.20 seconds, improving Yuliya Pechonkina's 16-year-old record of 52.34 (2003). Muhammad was only the second woman in the history of the 400 m hurdles, after Sally Gunnell, to have won the Olympic title and broken the world record. In September, the IAAF ratified Muhammad's time as the official world record. On 29 August, in her first race as world record holder, she finished third at the Diamond League Final, running 54.13 s as Sydney McLaughlin took the win in 52.85 s.

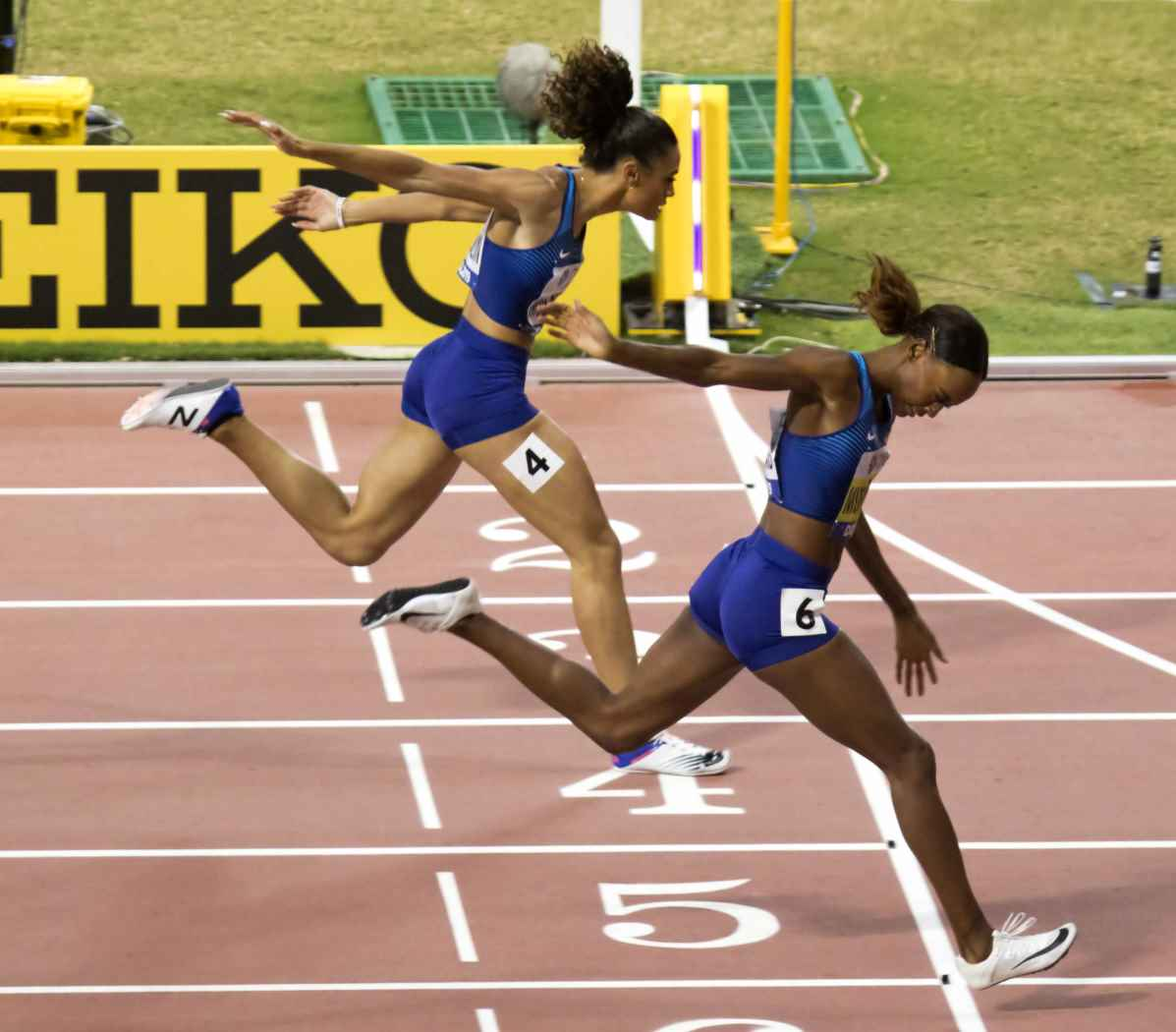
At the 2019 Doha World Championships, Muhammad (R) improved her own world record and held off 20-year-old Sydney McLaughlin

She won the gold medal at the 2019 World Championships, improving her time by 0.04 seconds, setting the new world record with a time of 52.16 seconds with McLaughlin finishing second in 52.23 s. She went onto win another gold medal as part of the USA's 4×400 m relay. At the end of the season, she won numerous awards for her season, including the Jackie Joyner-Kersee Award awarded by the U.S.A. Track and Field Federation, World Women's Athlete of the Year, awarded by Track and Field News having been selected first choice by 24 of the publication's 36-member panel, and Female World Athlete of the Year by World Athletics.

==== 2020-2022: Olympic silver medal and world bronze medal ====
In 2021, Muhammad finished second at the US Olympic trials, in 52.42 s, her third fastest time. She finished second behind Sydney McLaughlin who broke Muhammad's world record of 52.16 s by running 51.90 s. At the Olympics held in Tokyo, she won the silver medal behind McLaughlin, running a big new personal best of 51.58 s to go under McLaughlin's previous world record. She went onto win a gold medal in the 4×400 m relay, her second career Olympic gold. On 21 August, she won at the Prefontaine Classic, running a meeting record of 52.77 s to finish over a second ahead of second-placed Shamier Little (53.79 s). She ended her season with a fourth-placed finish at the Lausanne Diamond League, running 54.50 s.

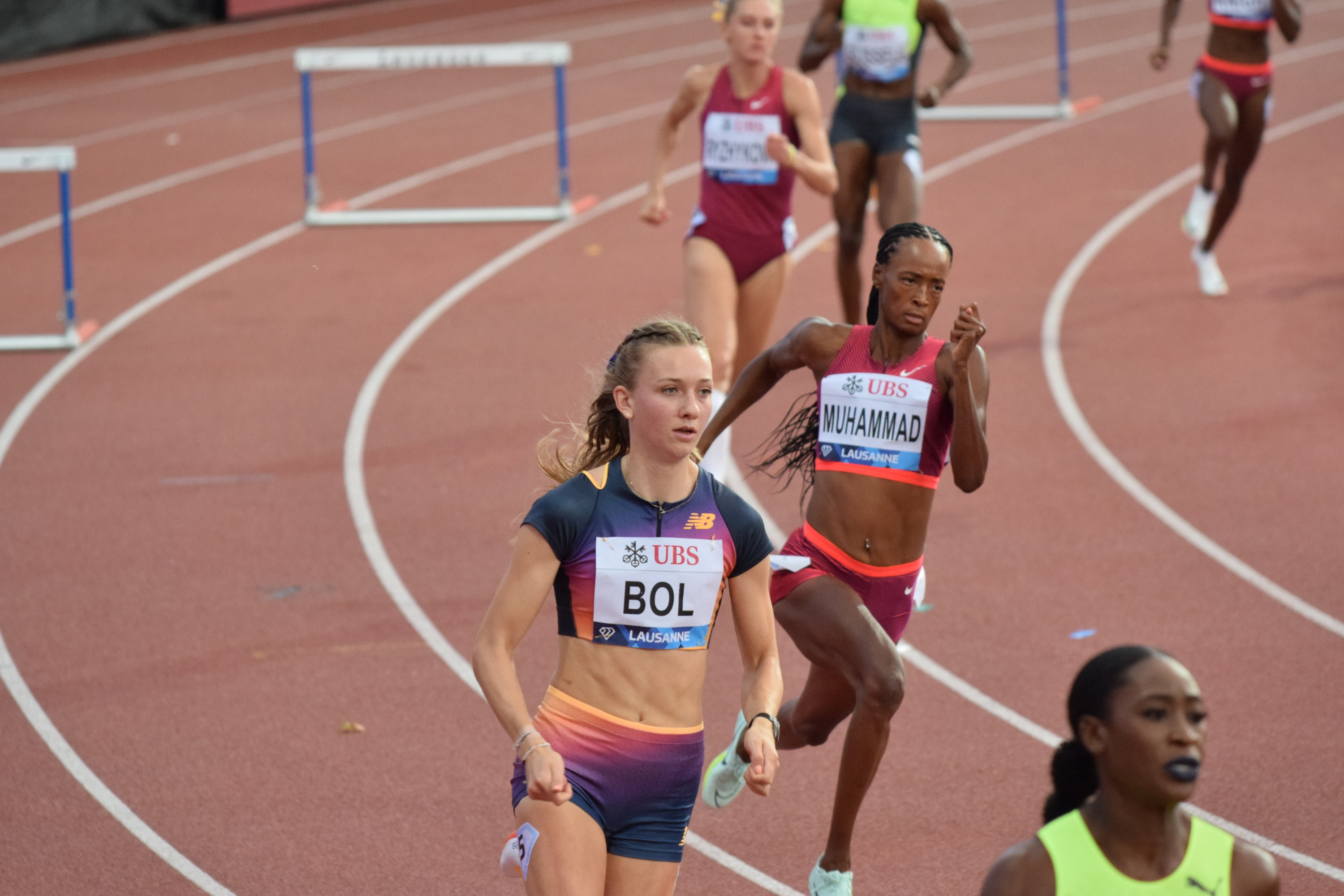
Muhammad (middle) competing at the 2022 Lausanne Diamond League.

The following year, on 21 May, Muhammad won her first Diamond League of the year, running 54.54 s to win in Birmingham. After a hamstring injury forced her to miss the US Championships, she next competed at the World Championships in Eugene, where she won the bronze medal in 53.13 s. On 4 September, she took the win at the Meeting Città di Padova, clocking a time of 53.84 s. At the Diamond League Final on 8 September, Muhammad finished fourth in 53.83 s.

==== 2023-present: Later career ====
At the US Championships, Muhammad finished second over 400 m hurdles, running a time of 53.53 s. In August, competing at the World Championships in Budapest, she ran 54.19 s in her semi-final and did not qualify for the final. At the Championships, she stated that she had been "nursing an injury over the past few weeks". In 2024, she finished sixth in the final of the 400 m hurdles at the US Olympic trials, running 54.27 s.

"I've had a lot of good moments. I think I've ticked every single box there is to tick in this sport. At 35, I'm definitely happy with the year, especially with all the injuries I've had leading up to this point. I'm proud of all my accomplishments, really."

— Muhammad reflecting on her career following the 2025 World Championships.

The following year, she opened her season outdoors at the Kingston Grand Slam, where she finished third in the long hurdles category, having run 54.59 s over 400 m hurdles and 52.21 s over the flat 400 m. On 12 April, she won at the Botswana Golden Grand Prix in Gaborone. She clocked a time of 53.81 s, her fastest in two years. At the Oslo Diamond League on 12 June, Muhammad won over 400 m hurdles, clocking a season's best of 53.34 s, it was her first Diamond League win since May 2022. On 11 July, she finished second behind Femke Bol at the Monaco Diamond League, improving her season's best to 52.58 s.

At the US Championships, Muhammad won her fifth US title, running a time of 52.65 s to triumph over second-placed Anna Cockrell (52.89). In September, at the World Championships in Tokyo, she made the final of the 400 m hurdles, where she finished seventh. She initially announced her retirement from the sport following the Championships, but reversed her decision the following year.

Muhammad competes at the 2026 Weltklasse Zürich.

She opened her 2026 season at the Clyde Hart Classic, competing in her first 800 m in eleven years, she ran a personal best of 2:04.51 to finish second, triumphing over the likes of Alexis Holmes and Gianna Woodruff. On 4 June, Muhammad finished fourth at the Golden Gala in Rome, clocking a time of 53.39 s - her fastest ever season opener. She improved her season's best to 53.16 in finishing second behind Anna Cockrell at the Zürich Weltklasse. At the inaugural World Ultimate Championships in Budapest, Muhammad finished fourth in the 400 m hurdles final in another season's best of 53.11 s. She announced her retirement from the sport following the Championships.

== Track statistics ==
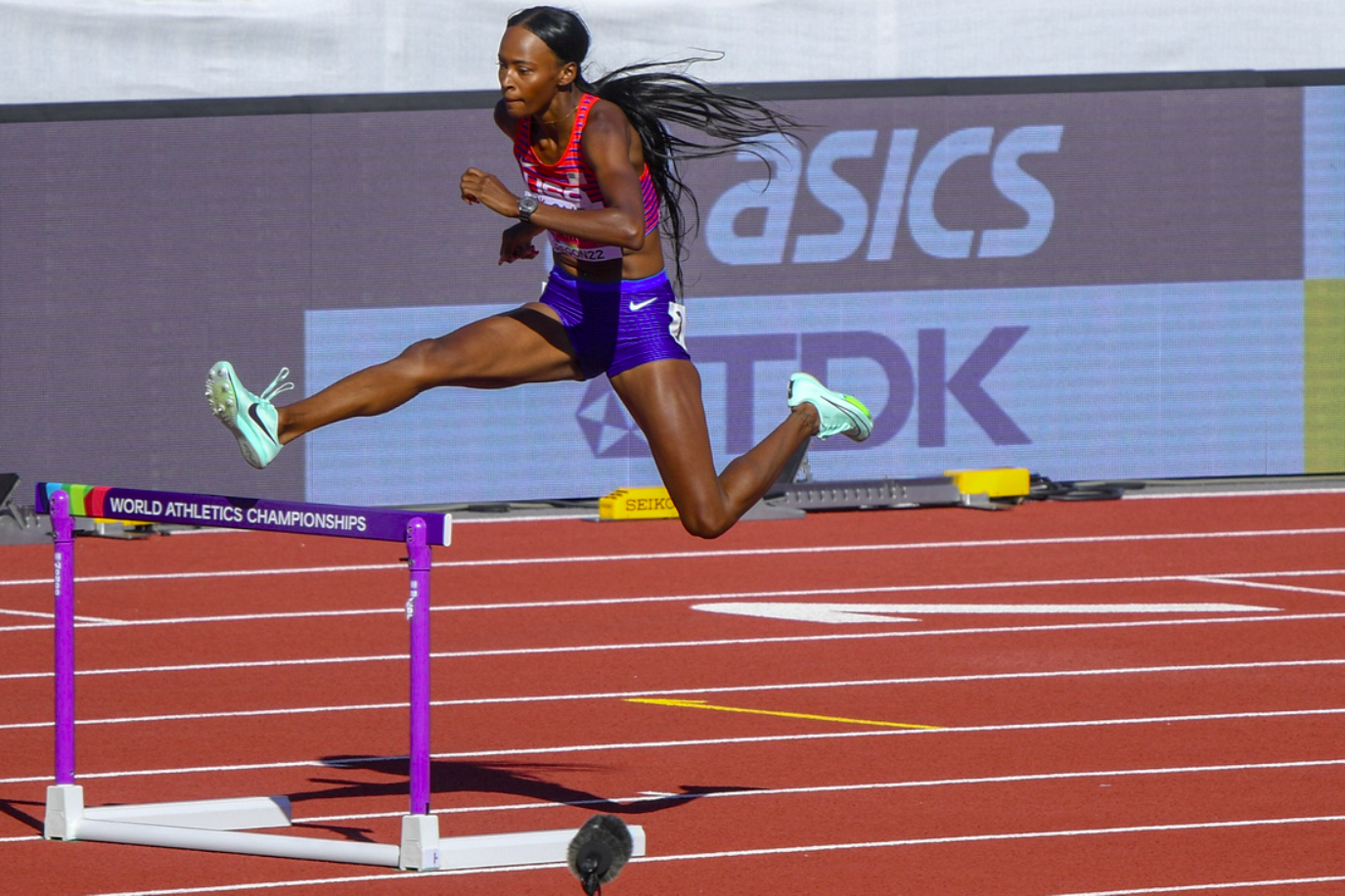
Dalilah Muhammad hurdles at the 2022 World Championships in Eugene

Information from World Athletics profile unless otherwise noted.

=== Personal bests ===
Event	Time (s)	Wind (m/s)	Venue	Date	Notes
400 m hurdles	51.58	—N/a	Tokyo, Japan	August 4, 2021	Third-fastest woman of all time
400 m dash	50.60	—N/a	Chorzów, Poland	June 16, 2019	
4 × 400 m relay split	48.94	—N/a	Tokyo, Japan	August 7, 2021	third leg
200 m dash	23.35	-0.1	Palo Alto, CA, United States	March 30, 2019	
100 m hurdles	13.33	+1.9	Austin, TX, United States	May 26, 2012	
100 m dash	11.42	+1.7	Los Angeles, CA, United States	May 4, 2013	
60 m hurdles indoor	8.23	—N/a	Fayetteville, AR, United States	March 2, 2012	

=== International championships ===
Representing the United States
Year	Competition	Venue	Position	Event	Time	Notes
2007	World Youth Championships	Ostrava, Czech Republic	1st	400 m hurdles	57.25	
2007	World Youth Championships	Ostrava, Czech Republic	1st	Medley relay	2:08.38	(Note: Muhammad did not run in the final, in which final team finished first earning all team members gold medals)
2009	Pan American Junior Championships	Port of Spain, Trinidad and Tobago	2nd	400 m hurdles	58.42	
2013	World Championships	Moscow, Russia	2nd	400 m hurdles	54.09	
2016	Olympic Games	Rio de Janeiro, Brazil	1st	400 m hurdles	53.13	
2017	World Championships	London, United Kingdom	2nd	400 m hurdles	53.50	
2019	World Championships	Doha, Qatar	1st	400 m hurdles	52.16	WR
2019	World Championships	Doha, Qatar	1st	4 × 400 m relay	3:18.92	
2021	Olympic Games	Tokyo, Japan	2nd	400 m hurdles	51.58	PB
2021	Olympic Games	Tokyo, Japan	1st	4 × 400 m relay	3:16.85	
2022	World Championships	Eugene, OR, United States	3rd	400 m hurdles	53.13	SB
2023	World Championships	Budapest, Hungary	9th (sf)	400 m hurdles	54.19	
2025	World Championships	Tokyo, Japan	7th	400 m hurdles	54.82	
2026	World Ultimate Championship	Budapest, Hungary	4th	400 m hurdles	53.11	

=== Circuit performances ===
Grand Slam Track results
Slam	Race group	Event	Pl.	Time	Prize money
2025 Kingston Slam	Long hurdles	400 m hurdles	2nd	54.59	US$50,000
2025 Kingston Slam	Long hurdles	400 m	3rd	52.21	US$50,000
2025 Philadelphia Slam	Long hurdles	400 m hurdles	4th	54.88	US$20,000
2025 Philadelphia Slam	Long hurdles	400 m	5th	53.29	US$20,000

==== Wins and titles ====
- Diamond League champion (2): 2017, 2018.
  - 2016 (2): London, Lausanne
  - 2017 (1): Brussels
  - 2018 (3): Shanghai, Oslo, Zürich
  - 2019 (2): Doha, Rome
  - 2021 (1): Eugene (MR)
  - 2022 (1): Birmingham
  - 2025 (1): Oslo

=== National championships ===
Year	Competition	Venue	Position	Event	Time
Representing the USC Trojans (2009–2012) and Nike (2013–present)
2009	NCAA Division I Championships	Fayetteville, Arkansas	3rd	400 m hurdles	56.65
2009	U.S. Junior Championships	Eugene, Oregon	1st	400 m hurdles	57.32
2010	NCAA Division I Championships	Eugene, Oregon	9th	400 m hurdles	57.85
2010	NCAA Division I Championships	Eugene, Oregon	17th	4 × 400 m relay	3:39.90
2011	NCAA Division I Championships	Des Moines, Iowa	6th	400 m hurdles	57.88
2012	NCAA Division I Championships	Des Moines, Iowa	5th	400 m hurdles	56.71
2012	U.S. Olympic Trials	Eugene, Oregon	20th	400 m hurdles	58.46
2013	U.S. Championships	Des Moines, Iowa	1st	400 m hurdles	53.83
2015	U.S. Championships	Eugene, Oregon	11th	400 m hurdles	57.33
2016	U.S. Olympic Trials	Eugene, Oregon	1st	400 m hurdles	52.88
2017	U.S. Championships	Sacramento, California	1st	400 m hurdles	52.64
2019	U.S. Championships	Des Moines, Iowa	1st	400 m hurdles	52.20
2021	U.S. Olympic Trials	Eugene, Oregon	2nd	400 m hurdles	52.42
2023	U.S. Championships	Eugene, Oregon	2nd	400 m hurdles	53.53
2024	U.S. Olympic Trials	Eugene, Oregon	6th	400 m hurdles	54.27
2025	U.S. Championships	Eugene, Oregon	1st	400 m hurdles	52.65
2026	U.S. Championships	New York City, New York	− (f)	400 m hurdles	DQ

- NCAA results from Track & Field Results Reporting System.

== Awards ==
- World Athletics Awards

World Athlete of the Year (Women)：2019

== See also ==
- Muslim women in sport

== Notes ==
Records
Preceded by (Russia) Yuliya Pechonkina	Women's 400 m hurdles world record holder July 28, 2019 – June 27, 2021	Succeeded by (United States) Sydney McLaughlin
Achievements
Preceded by Zuzana Hejnová; Sydney McLaughlin	Women's 400 m hurdles season's best performance 2016, 2017; 2019	Succeeded by Sydney McLaughlin; Femke Bol
Awards
Preceded by (South Africa) Caster Semenya	Women's Track & Field Athlete of the Year; 2019	Succeeded by (Venezuela) Yulimar Rojas
