= 2018 Arab Junior Athletics Championships =

18th Arab Junior Athletics Championships
- Dates: 19–22 April
- Host city: Amman, Jordan
- Venue: Baccalaureat School
- Events: 44
- Participation: 423 athletes from 16 nations

The 2018 Arab Junior Athletics Championships was the eighteenth edition of the international athletics competition for under-20 athletes from Arab countries. It took place between 19–22 April at the Baccalaureat School in Amman, Jordan. It was the second time that Jordan hosted the event after Amman in 2012. A total of 44 athletics events were contested, 22 for men and 22 for women.

== Medal summary ==
=== Men ===
Event	Gold		Silver		Bronze	
100 metres	Mohamed Mehdi zakraoui (ALG)	10.701	Ammar Essifi (OMN)	10.706	Ali Khalid Mas (KSA)	10:72
200 metres	Ahmed Omar Adem (KSA)	21.41	Mohamed Mehdi zakraoui (ALG)	21.65	Jabr Hilal Rached (QAT)	21.74
400 metres	Slimane Moula (ALG)	46.73	Anouar El Oufi (MAR)	47.71	Mounir Hzel (MAR)	48.05
800 metres	Mohanned Seifeddine (QAT)	1:53.85	Abdallah Maadhalib (MAR)	1:54.14	Zaher Chraf (MAR)	1:55.65
1500 metres	Soltane El Hemdaoui (MAR)	3:48.49	Cherif ElAtaouna (JOR)	3:56.19	Peter Khouri (LIB)	4:00.87
5000 metres	Cherif ElAtaouna (JOR)	14:43.20	Mohamed Rachdi (MAR)	14:45.35	Hichem Boulkhil (MAR)	15:23.01
10,000 metres	Anouar Ouzine (MAR)	31:25	Noureddine Mouhamed (YEM)	32:01	Youssef Hasaballah Ramadhane (SUD)	32:30
110 m hurdles	Momahed EL Anzi (KUW)	14.02	Saoud El Hamidi (QAT)	14.06	Oussema Hammi (MAR)	14.24
400 m hurdles	Ismael Menyeni (MAR)	53.09	Oussema Hammi (MAR)	53.22	Fahd Ben Ammar (TUN)	55.00
3000 m steeplechase	Mouhanned Khamis (QAT)	9:13.16	Mouhamed Rachdi (MAR)	9:15.12	Abdelrahim Louktam (MAR)	9:17.02
4 × 100 m relay	Saudi Arabia (KSA)	41.16	Algeria (ALG)	41.43	Oman (OMN)	41.52
4 × 400 m relay	Morocco (MAR)	3:16.60	Saudi Arabia (KSA)	3:22.09	Oman (OMN)	3:22.32
10 km walk	Hamza Hmidi (TUN)	44:41	Mehdi Abidi (ALG)	45:23	Othman Chibaoui (ALG)	45:55
High jump	Mohamed El behiri (JOR)	2.05 m	Hussein Nasser (KSA)	2.00 m	Yassine Hajjaji (MAR)	2.00 m
Pole vault	AbdelHamid Essaied (EGY)	4.60 m	Ahmed Yassin (KSA)	4.20 m	Salah Talal Ibrahim (KUW)	3.80 m
Long jump	Yassine Hajjaji (MAR)	7.24 m	Amir Moussaoui (ALG)	7.17 m	Rached Abdallah Rached (QAT)	7.15 m
Triple jump	Houssem Choumane (EGY)	15.42 m	Sofiane Zakour (MAR)	15.33 m	Amazigh HAddadi (ALG)	15.09 m
Shot put	Mouadh Saber (QAT)	19.80 m	Mohammed Chachi (MAR)	17.88 m	Moatez Mohammed (EGY)	17.86 m
Discus throw	Mouadh Saber (QAT)	58.44 m	Mohammed Chachi (MAR)	53.16 m	Mostafa Hasan Abou Chahine (EGY)	51.37 m
Hammer throw	Ali Hachem (EGY)	60.81 m	Saied Ali Abboudi (ALG)	60.39 m	Youssef Hichem Mohamed (EGY)	59.88 m
Javelin throw	Yassine Khalfaoui (TUN)	59.06 m	Abdelmajid El Sbii (KSA)	56.67 m	Abdelaziz El Hemdani (KUW)	56.50 m
Decathlon	Ahmed Yassin (KSA)	6718 Pts	Issa Jarrah (KSA)	5378 Pts	Yakoub El Bather (KUW)	4743 Pts

=== Women ===
Event	Gold		Silver		Bronze	
100 metres	Lea Obeid (LIB)	12.51	Maram Issa (EGY)	12.52	Hedil Abboud (LBY)	12.60 NR
200 metres	Alia Bouchnak (JOR)	24.64	Hajer Dhaou (MAR)	24.88	Chaima Ayachi (TUN)	25.43
400 metres	Sarra Hechmi (MAR)	54.54	Fatma Rzig (TUN)	57.11	Alia Bouchnak (JOR)	57.23
800 metres	imen Abdeldeim (MAR)	2:11.22	Chaima Ismaili (MAR)	2:17.54	Haya Elyaakiba (JOR)	2:33.88
1500 metres	Meriem Azrour (MAR)	4:30.94	imen Abdeldeim (MAR)	4:34.41	Sirine Kadri (TUN)	4:38.22
3000 metres	Kaouther Abida (MAR)	9:54.72	Khadija Hebbeche (ALG)	10:10.66	Souheila Bahtar (MAR)	10:19.42
5000 metres	Kaouther Abida (MAR)	17:00	Lamia Hini (MAR)	17:21	Hanene El Achouche (JOR)	19:14
100 m hurdles	Nour Nadi (MAR)	14.02 CR	Imen Nakhili (MAR)	14.63	Yara El Khatib (JOR)	19.26
400 m hurdles	Sarra Hechmi (MAR)	1:01.04	Lobna Ben Haja (ALG)	1:01.24	Raghd El Hayyari (JOR)	1:19.40
3000 m steeplechase	Ikram Ouaziz (MAR)	?:??.??	Houda Ahtitou (MAR)	??:??.??	Marwa Boughanem (TUN)	??:??.??
4 × 100 m relay	Morocco (MAR)	49.84	Jordan (JOR)	49.93	Algeria (ALG)	51.41
4 × 400 m relay	Morocco (MAR)	3:53.89	Algeria (ALG)	3:57.28	Jordan (JOR)	4:31.59
10 km walk	Souad Izzi (ALG)	50:12	Rihem Bouzid (TUN)	50:49	Meriem Amel Zoubiri (ALG)	54:04
High jump	Khadija Manel Ameur (ALG)	1.66 m	Imen El Atouhini (MAR)	1.63 m	Nour El Kadhi (JOR)	1.60 m
Pole vault	Nour Slimane (EGY)	3.60 m CR	Imen Rhouma (TUN)	3.55 m	Yassmine Mostafa (EGY)	3.40 m
Long jump	Oumeima Helal (MAR)	5.92 m	Nesrine Jomrani (MAR)	5.72 m	Hedil Abboud (LBY)	5.47 m NR
Triple jump	Dhekra Aoun (TUN)	11.97 m	Marwa Hechmi (ALG)	11.74 m	Nesrine Jomrani (MAR)	11.61 m
Shot put	Zeineb Zaroul (MAR)	13.77 m	Rana Ahmed (EGY)	11.94 m	Wydad Bisli (ALG)	11.74 m
Discus throw	Rana Khaled (EGY)	47.00 m	Saida Hamidi (MAR)	46.79 m	Katia Hamoumraoui (ALG)	40.26 m
Javelin throw	Shirine Chaabene (EGY)	48.54 m CR	Gabi Majdi (EGY)	48.23 m	Saida Hamidi (MAR)	34.63 m
Hammer throw	Rania Naji (QAT)	47.16 m	Chahrazed Khalloufi (ALG)	44.28 m	Katia Bouchen (ALG)	43.73 m
Heptathlon	Noura Nadi (MAR)	4742 pts CR	Widad Yasli (ALG)	4387 Pts	Afef Ben Haja (ALG)	4100 Pts

== Medal table ==
Host nation

Rank	Nation	Gold	Silver	Bronze	Total
1	Morocco (MAR)	18	17	9	44
2	Egypt (EGY)	6	3	3	12
3	Qatar (QAT)	5	1	2	8
4	Algeria (ALG)	4	11	8	23
5	Saudi Arabia (KSA)	3	5	1	9
6	Tunisia (TUN)	3	3	4	10
7	Jordan (JOR)*	3	2	7	12
8	Kuwait (KUW)	1	0	4	5
9	Lebanon (LIB)	1	0	1	2
10	Oman (OMN)	0	1	2	3
11	Yemen (YEM)	0	1	0	1
12	Libya (LBY)	0	0	2	2
13	Sudan (SUD)	0	0	1	1
Totals (13 entries)		44	44	44	132
