= 2018 African Championships in Athletics – Men's 3000 metres steeplechase =

The men's 3000 metres steeplechase event at the 2018 African Championships in Athletics was held on 3 August in Asaba, Nigeria.

== Results ==
Rank	Athlete	Nationality	Time	Notes
1st place, gold medalist(s)	Conseslus Kipruto	Kenya	8:26.37	
2nd place, silver medalist(s)	Soufiane El Bakkali	Morocco	8:28.01	
3rd place, bronze medalist(s)	Getnet Wale	Ethiopia	8:30.87	
4	Amos Kirui	Kenya	8:33.83	
5	Yemane Haileselassie	Eritrea	8:36.58	
6	Hailemariyam Amare	Ethiopia	8:38.46	
7	Jigsa Tolosa	Ethiopia	8:42.14	
8	Mehari Tesfai	Eritrea	8:44.12	
8	Mohamed Tindouft	Morocco	8:44.12	
10	Hicham Sigueni	Morocco	8:47.02	
11	Mohamed Ismail Ibrahim	Djibouti	8:48.25	
12	Siboniso Soldaka	South Africa	9:00.87	
	Salem Attiaallah	Egypt	DNS	
	Kennedy Njiru	Kenya	DNS	
