= 2011 World Youth Championships in Athletics – Boys' 2000 metres steeplechase =

Boys' 2000 metres steeplechase at the 2011 World Youth Championships in Athletics
- Venue: Stadium Lille Métropole
- Dates: 6 July (heats); 8 July (final)
- Competitors: 33
- Winning time: 5:28.65 WYL

Medalists
gold medal	Conseslus Kipruto	Kenya
silver medal	Gilbert Kirui	Kenya
bronze medal	Zakaria Kiprotich	Uganda

The boys' 2000 metres steeplechase at the 2011 World Youth Championships in Athletics was held at the Stadium Lille Métropole on 6 and 8 July.

== Medalists ==
Gold	Silver	Bronze
Conseslus Kipruto; Kenya	Gilbert Kirui; Kenya	Zacharia Kiprotich; Uganda

== Records ==
Prior to the competition, the following records were as follows.

World Youth Best	Nabil Ouhaddi (MAR)	5:21.36	Rabat, Morocco	16 July 2006
Championship Record	Abel Mutai (KEN)	5:24.69	Marrakesh, Morocco	15 July 2005
World Youth Leading	Conseslus Kipruto (KEN)	5:29.3	Nairobi, Kenya	8 June 2011

== Heats ==
Qualification rule: first 4 of each heat (Q) plus the 4 fastest times (q) qualified.

=== Heat 1 ===
Rank	Name	Nationality	Time	Notes
1	Gilbert Kiplangat Kirui	Kenya	5:34.98	Q
2	Jaouad Chemlal	Morocco	5:45.91	Q, SB
3	Zakaria Kiprotich	Uganda	5:46.66	Q, SB
4	Viktor Bakharev	Russia	5:48.88	Q, PB
5	Gonzalo Basconcelo	Spain	5:50.03	q, PB
6	Malek Ben Amor	Tunisia	5:50.95	q, PB
7	Youssef Bouissane	Morocco	5:53.54	
8	Antoine Thibeault	Canada	5:53.78	PB
9	Katleho Dyoyi	South Africa	5:58.04	
10	Italo Quazzola	Italy	5:59.78	
11	Gabriel Corda	Argentina	6:05.45	PB
12	Fayçal Doucen	Algeria	6:06.53	PB
13	Giancarlo Baez	Puerto Rico	6:08.23	
14	Eirik Bråten Richenberg	Norway	6:08.81	
15	Mateo Rossetto	Argentina	6:10.73	
16	Rajendra Bind	India	6:14.53	

=== Heat 2 ===
Rank	Name	Nationality	Time	Notes
1	Conseslus Kipruto	Kenya	5:31.27	Q
2	Mohammad Mueedh Al Barakati	Saudi Arabia	5:43.00	Q, PB
3	Zak Seddon	United Kingdom	5:46.98	Q, PB
4	Animut Minalu	Ethiopia	5:47.36	Q, PB
5	Deon Clifford	Canada	5:51.47	q, PB
6	Ivan Savka	Ukraine	5:53.51	q, PB
7	Jonathan Romeo	Spain	6:01.82	
8	Billel Zeghdoudi	Algeria	6:04.87	PB
9	Hashim Salah Mohamed	Qatar	6:05.06	SB
10	Josué Marrero	Puerto Rico	6:05.12	
11	Timothé André	France	6:09.70	
12	Ryo Uchimura	Japan	6:10.45	
13	Magnus Hannevig Pettersen	Norway	6:13.40	
14	Áron Tóth	Hungary	6:17.60	
15	Jacob Tseko	South Africa	6:21.81	
16	Dileepa Prasad Abeykoon	Sri Lanka	6:26.26	
17	Carles Gómez	Andorra	6:36.70	PB

== Final ==
Rank	Name	Nationality	Time	Notes
1st place, gold medalist(s)	Conseslus Kipruto	Kenya	5:28.65	WYL
2nd place, silver medalist(s)	Gilbert Kiplangat Kirui	Kenya	5:30.49	
3rd place, bronze medalist(s)	Zakaria Kiprotich	Uganda	5:37.98	PB
4	Jaouad Chemlal	Morocco	5:38.26	SB
5	Zak Seddon	United Kingdom	5:40.62	PB
6	Mohammad Mueedh Al Barakati	Saudi Arabia	5:43.61	
7	Animut Minalu	Ethiopia	5:46.50	PB
8	Deon Clifford	Canada	5:52.34	
9	Malek Ben Amor	Tunisia	5:52.83	
10	Viktor Bakharev	Russia	5:54.71	
11	Gonzalo Basconcelo	Spain	6:00.24	
12	Ivan Savka	Ukraine	6:00.56	
