= Bilal Tabti =

Algerian athlete (born 1993)

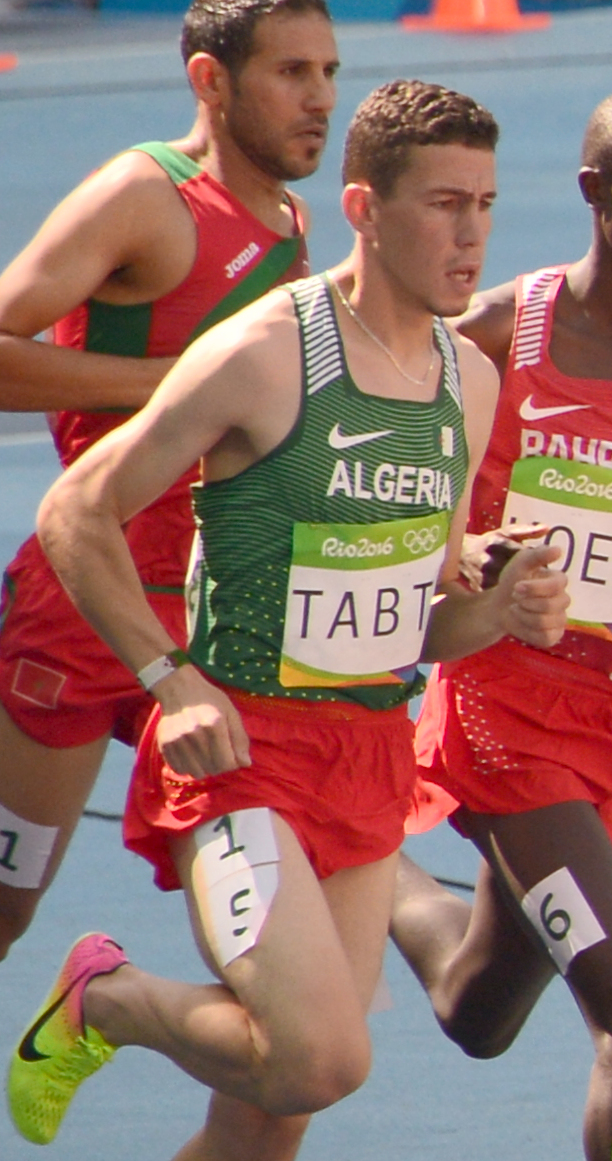
- Tabti at the 2016 Olympics

Personal information
- Nationality: Algerian
- Born: 7 June 1993 (age 33) Jijel, Algeria
- Education: University of Jijel
- Height: 175 cm (5 ft 9 in)
- Weight: 62 kg (137 lb)

Sport
- Country: Algeria
- Sport: Track and field
- Event: 3000 metres steeplechase
- Club: Amiens UC, France

Achievements and titles
- Personal best: 8:20.20 (2017)

Bilal Tabti (Arabic: بلال تابتي; born 7 June 1993) is an Algerian athlete specialising in the 3000 metres steeplechase. He placed 13th at the 2015 World Championships, but failed to reach the final at the 2016 Olympics.

== Competition record ==
Year	Competition	Venue	Position	Event	Notes
Representing Algeria
2010	Youth Olympic Games	Singapore	4th	2000 m s'chase	5:44.34
2012	World Junior Championships	Barcelona, Spain	5th	3000 m s'chase	8:32.08
2015	World Championships	Beijing, China	13th	3000 m s'chase	8:29.04
2015	African Games	Brazzaville, Republic of the Congo	10th	3000 m s'chase	8:41.48
2016	Olympic Games	Rio de Janeiro, Brazil	30th (h)	3000 m s'chase	8:38.87
2017	World Championships	London, United Kingdom	9th (h)	3000 m s'chase	8:23.28^{1}
2019	African Games	Rabat, Morocco	10th	3000 m s'chase	8:45.59
2019	World Championships	Doha, Qatar	34th (h)	3000 m s'chase	8:35.15
2022	Mediterranean Games	Oran, Algeria	1st	3000 m s'chase	8:22.79
2022	World Championships	Eugene, United States	34th (h)	3000 m s'chase	8:38.45
2023	Arab Games	Oran, Algeria	2nd	3000 m s'chase	8:25.32
2024	African Championships	Douala, Cameroon	8th	3000 m s'chase	8:41.68
2024	Olympic Games	Paris, France	35th (h)	3000 m s'chase	9:04.81
2025	Arab Championships	Oran, Algeria	1st	3000 m s'chase	8:22.82

^{1}Disqualified in the final
