= List of Libyan records in athletics =

The following are the national records in athletics in Libya maintained by the Libyan Athletics Federation (LAF).

== Outdoor ==
Key to tables: Awaiting ratification Record not kept by LAF Not ratified or later rescinded by LAF

=== Men ===
Event	Record	Athlete	Date	Meet	Place	Ref.
100 m	10.42 (+1.0 m/s)	Ahmed Amaar	14 May 2021	ASUN Championships	Jacksonville, United States	
100 m	10.3 h	Mohamed Ali Abderrahim	16 July 1992		Tripoli, Libya	
200 m	20.91 (+0.7 m/s)	Mohamed Khouaja	8 October 2009		Damascus, Syria	
400 m	44.98	Mohamed Khouaja	30 July 2010	African Championships	Nairobi, Kenya	
800 m	1:48.08	Aboubaker El-Gatrouni	13 October 2003		Abuja, Nigeria	
1500 m	3:42.11	Aboubaker El-Gatrouni	24 May 2012		Rabat, Morocco	
3000 m	8:07.16	Ali Mabrouk El Zaidi	30 May 1999		Banská Bystrica, Slovakia	
5000 m	13:34.99	Ali Mabrouk El Zaidi	5 August 2000	KBC Night of Athletics	Hechtel-Eksel, Belgium	
5 km (road)	13:53	Mohamed Hrezi	14 April 2018	B.A.A. Half Marathon	Boston, United States	
10,000 m	28:30.58	Mohamed Hrezi	6 March 2022	Sound Running Ten	San Juan Capistrano, United States	
10 km (road)	27:59	Ali Mabrouk El Zaidi	2 June 2007		Groesbeek, Netherlands	
15 km (road)	42:42	Ali Mabrouk El Zaidi	2 December 2007		's-Heerenberg, Netherlands	
20 km (road)	59:01+	Mohamed Hrezi	16 January 2022	Houston Half Marathon	Houston, United States	
Half marathon	1:02:08	Mohamed Hrezi	16 January 2022	Houston Half Marathon	Houston, United States	
Marathon	2:13:33	Ali Mabrouk El Zaidi	23 November 2008	Milan Marathon	Milan, Italy	
110 m hurdles	15.08 (−2.8 m/s)	Zuheir El-Menghawi	11 May 2009		Riyadh, Saudi Arabia	
400 m hurdles	50.21	Hamza Deyaf	3 July 2009	Mediterranean Games	Pescara, Italy	
3000 m steeplechase	9:02.84	Abderahim Slougui	16 July 2016		Radès, Tunisia	
High jump	2.03 m	Fethi Abdulmounem Aboud	27 August 2008		Amman, Jordan	
Pole vault	3.70 m	Ali Magrowi	25 July 1969		Tripoli, Libya	
Long jump	8.03 m (+1.3 m/s)	Mohamed Bishty	25 May 1985		Chania, Greece	
Triple jump	16.13 m	Fethi Khalifa Aboud	5 August 1985	Pan Arab Games	Casablanca, Morocco	
Shot put	17.18 m	Omar Musa Mejbari	1 August 1971		Tripoli, Libya	
Discus throw	55.35 m	Ali Khelifa Abdallah	9 April 2008		Nabeul, Tunisia	
Hammer throw	50.81 m	Saleh Al Souei	17 July 1992		Tripoli, Libya	
Javelin throw	55.54 m	Riad Ali Hassan	19 October 2010		Kuwait City, Kuwait	
Decathlon	6186 pts h	Imad Koueb	4–5 October 2001		Damascus, Syria	
Decathlon	100m / Long jump / Shot put / High jump / 400m / 110m H / Discus / Pole vault / Javelin / 1500m; 11.0 / 6.85 m / 10.58 m / 1.80 m / 50.8 / 15.7 / 32.55 m / 3.30 m / 41.92 m / 5:06.3					
20 km walk (road)	1:44:26	Idriss Bakloul	26 April 1985		Tripoli, Libya	
50 km walk (road)	5:15:53	Ahmed Issa	15 September 1967		Tunis, Tunisia	
4 × 100 m relay	42.08	Libya	8 August 1985	Pan Arab Games	Casablanca, Morocco	
4 × 400 m relay	3:10.00	Libya; Mohamed Khouaja; Hamza Deaf; Abubaker Tawerghi; Aboubaker Elghatruni	3 July 2009	Mediterranean Games	Pescara, Italy	

=== Women ===
Event	Record	Athlete	Date	Meet	Place	Ref.
100 m	12.60 (+0.8 m/s)	Hedil Aboud Fethi	20 April 2018	Arab Junior Championships	Amman, Jordan	
200 m	26.76 (+0.2 m/s)	Najla Aqdeir Ali Salem	4 October 2015		Milan, Italy	
400 m	56.89	Najla Aqdeir Ali Salem	21 May 2016		Lodi Vecchio, Italy	
800 m	2:08.12	Najla Aqdeir Ali Salem	7 May 2016		Pavia, Italy	
1500 m	4:32.42	Najla Aqdeir Ali Salem	24 June 2017		Cinisello Balsamo, Italy	
3000 m	11:46.7 h	Khawla Marzouk Souihi	10 June 2003		Tripoli, Libya	
5000 m						
10,000 m						
Marathon						
100 m hurdles						
400 m hurdles	1:01.54	Najla Aqdeir Ali Salem	14 June 2015		Rieti, Italy	
3000 m steeplechase	10:57.55	Najla Aqdeir Ali Salem	6 May 2017		Bergamo, Italy	
High jump	1.45 m	Afaf Al Jadi	30 September 1991		Tripoli, Libya	
Pole vault						
Long jump	5.47 m NWI	Hedil Aboud Fethi	19 April 2018	Arab Junior Championships	Amman, Jordan	
Triple jump						
Shot put	10.83 m	Areej Salem El Sayeh	8 May 2010		Cairo, Egypt	
Discus throw	52.04 m	Salem Rijaj Sanah	4 June 2016		Radès, Tunisia	
Hammer throw	50.92 m	Salem Rijaj Sanah	7 May 2016		Tlemcen, Algeria	
Javelin throw	37.21 m	Ebtehal Fethi Khalifa Aboud	9 February 2009		Niamey, Niger	
Heptathlon						
Heptathlon	100m H / High jump / Shot put / 200m / Long jump / Javelin / 800m					
20 km walk (road)						
50 km walk (road)						
4 × 100 m relay	55.1 h	Libya	30 September 1991		Tripoli, Libya	
4 × 400 m relay						

== Indoor ==
=== Men ===
Event	Record	Athlete	Date	Meet	Place	Ref.
60 m	6.87	Ahmed Amaar	26 February 2021	Atlantic Sun Championships	Lynchburg, United States	
60 m	6.87	Ahmed Amaar	27 February 2021	Atlantic Sun Championships	Lynchburg, United States	
200 m	21.91	Ahmed Amaar	10 December 2021	Hoosier Open	Bloomington, United States	
400 m						
800 m	1:52.64	Aboubaker El-Gatrouni	5 March 2004	World Championships	Budapest, Hungary	
800 m	1:50.99	Mohamed Hrezi	6 March 2011	IC4A Championships	Boston, United States	
1500 m						
One Mile	4:04.39 OT	Mohamed Hrezi	3 March 2012	Iowa State Last Chance NCAA Qualifier	Ames, United States	
3000 m	7:53.85	Mohamed Hrezi	5 February 2022	Dr. Sander Invitational	New York City, United States	
5000 m	13:34.32	Mohamed Hrezi	12 February 2022	BU Hemery Valentine Invitational	Boston, United States	
60 m hurdles						
High jump						
Pole vault						
Long jump						
Triple jump						
Shot put						
Heptathlon						
Heptathlon	60m / Long jump / Shot put / High jump / 60m H / Pole vault / 1000m					
5000 m walk						
4 × 400 m relay						

=== Women ===
Event	Record	Athlete	Date	Meet	Place	Ref.
60 m						
200 m						
400 m	59.63	Najla Aqdeir Ali Salem	28 January 2017		Magglingen, Switzerland	
800 m	2:10.99	Najla Aqdeir Ali Salem	6 March 2016		Ancona, Italy	
1500 m						
3000 m						
60 m hurdles						
High jump						
Pole vault						
Long jump						
Triple jump						
Shot put						
Pentathlon						
Pentathlon	60m H / High jump / Shot put / Long jump / 800m					
3000 m walk						
4 × 400 m relay						
