= Zak Seddon =

English athletics competitor

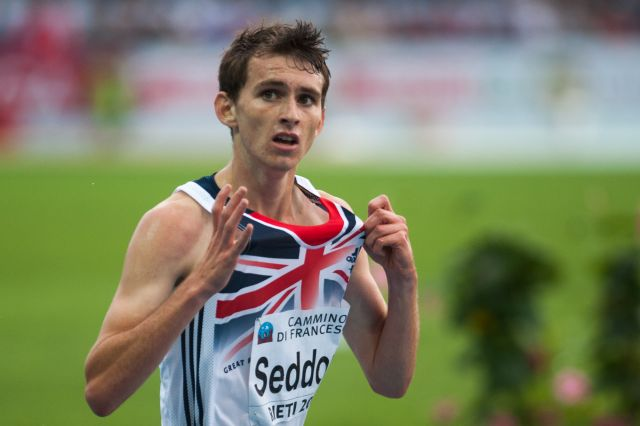
- Seddon in 2013

Personal information
- Born: 28 June 1994 (age 32) Twyford, England
- Education: Florida State University
- Height: 1.79 m (5 ft 10 in)
- Weight: 61 kg (134 lb)

Sport
- Sport: Athletics
- Event: 3000 m steeplechase
- College team: Florida State Seminoles
- Club: Bracknell AC
- Coached by: Jeff Seddon
Medal record
Men's athletics
Representing Great Britain
European Games
Bronze medal – third place	2023 Kraków-Małopolska	3000 m steeplechase

Zak William Seddon (born 28 June 1994) is an English runner specialising in the 3000 metres steeplechase. He competed at the 2020 Summer Olympics.

== Biography ==
Seddon was born in Berkshire, the second of four children to Jeffrey and Kathryn (née Beards). His younger brother is the Motherwell F.C footballer Steve Seddon. He also has an older sister, Danielle, and a younger brother, Matthew.

He won a gold medal at the 2013 European Junior Championships and competed for Great Britain at the 2017 World Championships.

Seddon was twice British 3000 metres steeplechase champion after winning the British Athletics Championships in 2018 and 2019.

At the delayed 2020 Olympic Games in Tokyo, he represented Great Britain in the steeplechase event.

== International competitions ==
Year	Competition	Venue	Position	Event	Notes
Representing Great Britain
2010	Youth Olympic Games	Singapore	2nd (B)	2000 m s'chase	5:52.13
2011	World Youth Championships	Lille, France	5th	2000 m s'chase	5:40.62
2011	Commonwealth Youth Games	Douglas, Isle of Man	1st	2000 m s'chase	5:41.81
2012	World Junior Championships	Barcelona, Spain	9th	3000 m s'chase	8:45.18
2013	European Junior Championships	Rieti, Italy	1st	3000 m s'chase	8:45.91
2017	World Championships	London, United Kingdom	22nd (h)	3000 m s'chase	8:32.84
2017	Universiade	Taipei, Taiwan	6th	3000 m s'chase	8:39.30
2018	European Championships	Berlin, Germany	5th	3000 m s'chase	8:37.28
2019	World Championships	Doha, Qatar	15th	3000 m s'chase	8:40.23
2021	Olympic Games	Tokyo, Japan	40th (h)	3000 m s'chase	8:43.29
2022	European Championships	Munich, Germany	24th (h)	3000 m s'chase	8:46.74
2024	European Championships	Rome, Italy	10th (h)	3000 m s'chase	8:28.50
2026	European Championships	Birmingham, United Kingdom	15th	3000 m s'chase	8:35.83

== Personal bests ==
Outdoor

- 1500 metres – 3:42.02 (Walnut 2015)
- One mile – 3:58.90 (London 2019)
- 3000 metres – 8:08.61 (London 2012)
- 5000 metres – 00:14:51 (Portsmouth 2022)
- 2000 metres steeplechase – 5:36.19 (Solihull 2017)
- 3000 metres steeplechase – 8:21.28 (Rome 2019)

Indoor

- One mile – 4:04.03 (Boston 2016)
- 3000 metres – 7:58.95 (Sheffield 2017)
