= 2012 World Junior Championships in Athletics – Men's 3000 metres steeplechase =

The men's 3000 metres steeplechase at the 2012 World Junior Championships in Athletics was held at the Estadi Olímpic Lluís Companys on 13 and 15 July.

== Medalists ==
Gold	Silver	Bronze
Conseslus Kipruto; Kenya	Gilbert Kiplangat Kirui; Kenya	Hicham Sigueni; Morocco

== Records ==
Prior to the competition, the existing world junior and championship records were as follows.

World Junior Record	Saif Saaeed Shaheen (KEN)	7:58.66	Brussels, Belgium	24 August 2001
Championship Record	Willy Rutto Komen (KEN)	8:14.00	Beijing, China	19 August 2006
World Junior Leading	Conseslus Kipruto (KEN)	8:08.92	Doha, Qatar	11 May 2012
Broken records during the 2012 World Junior Championships in Athletics
Championship Record & World Junior Leading	Conseslus Kipruto (KEN)	8:06.10	Barcelona, Spain	15 July 2012

== Results ==
=== Heats ===
Qualification: The first 4 of each heat (Q) and the 4 fastest times (q) qualified

Rank	Heat	Name	Nationality	Time	Note
1	2	Conseslus Kipruto	Kenya	8:19.46	Q
2	1	Gilbert Kiplangat Kirui	Kenya	8:26.58	Q
3	2	Weynay Ghebresilasie	Eritrea	8:37.01	Q
4	1	Hicham Sigueni	Morocco	8:37.94	Q
5	1	Meresa Kahsay	Ethiopia	8:38.01	Q, PB
6	2	Jaouad Chemlal	Morocco	8:41.05	Q
7	1	Ahmed Mohammed Burhan	Saudi Arabia	8:48.38	Q
8	1	Zak Seddon	Great Britain	8:49.67	q
9	1	Edward Owens	United States	8:52.99	q, PB
10	2	Bilal Tabti	Algeria	8:54.85	Q, PB
11	2	Szymon Kulka	Poland	8:55.93	q
12	1	Hashim Salah Mohamed	Qatar	8:56.15	q, PB
13	1	Ryan Cassidy	Canada	8:56.88	PB
14	2	Djilali Bedrani	France	8:56.98	
15	2	Mitko Tsenov	Bulgaria	8:57.98	
16	1	Julien Detre	France	9:00.32	
17	2	Malek Ben Amor	Tunisia	9:02.59	
18	1	Issam Zeghdane	Algeria	9:03.98	
19	1	Italo Quazzola	Italy	9:05.28	
20	2	Konstantin Wedel	Germany	9:05.64	
21	2	Darren Fahy	United States	9:08.69	
22	2	Antoine Thibeault	Canada	9:10.71	
23	1	José Nuno Paulo	Portugal	9:11.31	
24	1	Jonathan Romeo	Spain	9:14.86	
25	1	Adam Lipschitz	South Africa	9:16.17	
26	2	Christoph Graf	Switzerland	9:18.31	
27	1	Davorin Cimermancic	Slovenia	9:20.28	
28	2	Ivan Savka	Ukraine	9:24.97	
29	2	Jorge Blanco	Spain	9:31.22	
30	2	Bin Yu	China	9:46.23	
–	2	Animut Minalu	Ethiopia	DNS	

=== Final ===
Rank	Name	Nationality	Time	Note
1st place, gold medalist(s)	Conseslus Kipruto	Kenya	8:06.10	CR
2nd place, silver medalist(s)	Gilbert Kiplangat Kirui	Kenya	8:19.94	
3rd place, bronze medalist(s)	Hicham Sigueni	Morocco	8:30.14	
4	Jaouad Chemlal	Morocco	8:30.92	
5	Bilal Tabti	Algeria	8:32.08	NJ
6	Weynay Ghebresilasie	Eritrea	8:33.87	
7	Meresa Kahsay	Ethiopia	8:36.13	PB
8	Ahmed Mohammed Burhan	Saudi Arabia	8:36.14	
9	Zak Seddon	Great Britain	8:45.18	
10	Hashim Salah Mohamed	Qatar	8:51.35	PB
11	Edward Owens	United States	8:51.44	PB
-	Szymon Kulka	Poland	DNS	

== Participation ==
According to an unofficial count, 30 athletes from 23 countries participated in the event.

- Algeria (2)
- Bulgaria (1)
- Canada (2)
- China (1)
- Eritrea (1)
- Ethiopia (1)
- France (2)
- Germany (1)
- Italy (1)
- Kenya (2)
- Morocco (2)
- Poland (1)
- Portugal (1)
- Qatar (1)
- Saudi Arabia (1)
- Slovenia (1)
- South Africa (1)
- Spain (2)
- Switzerland (1)
- Tunisia (1)
- Ukraine (1)
- United Kingdom (1)
- United States (2)
