= Hashim Salah Mohamed =

Qatari long-distance runner

Personal information
- Born: 15 April 1994 (age 32)

Sport
- Sport: Athletics
- Event: 3000 m steeplechase

Hashim Salah Mohamed (born 15 April 1994) is a Qatari long-distance runner. He competed in the 3000 metres steeplechase at the 2015 World Championships in Beijing.

== Competition record ==
Year	Competition	Venue	Position	Event	Notes
Representing Qatar
2011	World Youth Championships	Lille, France	19th (h)	3000 m s'chase	6:05.06
2012	World Junior Championships	Barcelona, Spain	10th	3000 m s'chase	8:51.35
2013	Islamic Solidarity Games	Palembang, Indonesia	9th	1500 m	3:46.68
2014	IAAF World Relays	Nassau, Bahamas	7th	4 × 1500 m relay	15:10.77
2015	Asian Championships	Wuhan, China	2nd	3000 m s'chase	8:36.02
2015	World Championships	Beijing, China	37th (h)	3000 m s'chase	9:17.35
2017	IAAF World Relays	Nassau, Bahamas	6th	4 × 800 m relay	7:28.25
2017	Asian Indoor and Martial Arts Games	Ashgabat, Turkmenistan	4th	3000 m	8:07.60
2017	Asian Indoor and Martial Arts Games	Ashgabat, Turkmenistan	4th (h)	4 × 400 m relay	3:21.38

== Personal bests ==
Outdoor

- 1500 metres – 3:44.61 (Amsterdam 2013)
- 3000 metres steeplechase – 8:33.25 (Sollentuna 2015)

Indoor

- 3000 metres – 8:03.27 (Doha 2016)
