= Conseslus Kipruto =

Kenyan middle-distance runner

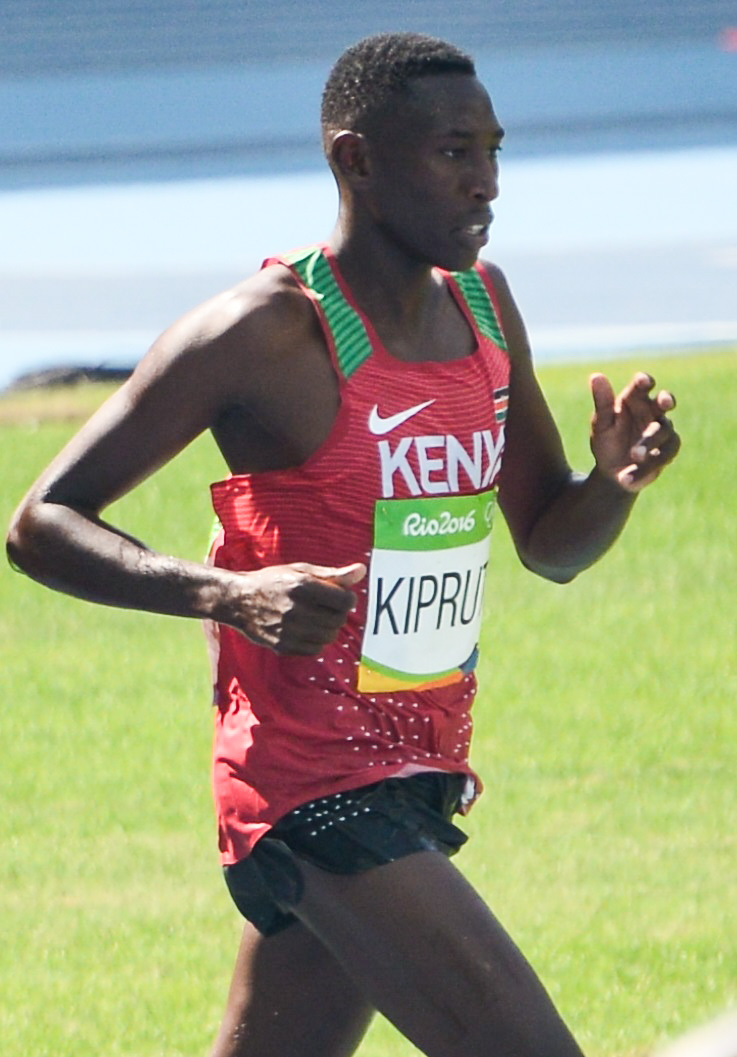
- Kipruto at the 2016 Rio Olympics

Personal information
- Born: 8 December 1994 (age 31) Eldoret, Kenya
- Height: 1.67 m (5 ft 6 in)
- Weight: 58 kg (128 lb)

Sport
- Country: Kenya
- Sport: Athletics
- Event: 3000 m steeplechase
Medal record
Men's athletics
Representing Kenya
Olympic Games
Gold medal – first place	2016 Rio de Janeiro	3000 m st.
World Championships
Gold medal – first place	2017 London	3000 m st.
Gold medal – first place	2019 Doha	3000 m st.
Silver medal – second place	2013 Moscow	3000 m st.
Silver medal – second place	2015 Beijing	3000 m st.
Bronze medal – third place	2022 Eugene	3000 m st.
Diamond League
First place	2013	3000 m st.
First place	2016	3000 m st.
First place	2017	3000 m st.
First place	2018	3000 m st.
Continental Cup
Gold medal – first place	2018 Ostrava	3000 m st.
Commonwealth Games
Gold medal – first place	2018 Gold Coast	3000 m st.
African Championships
Gold medal – first place	2018 Asaba	3000 m st.
World Junior Championships
Gold medal – first place	2012 Barcelona	3000 m st.
World Youth Championships
Gold medal – first place	2011 Lille	2000 m st.

Conseslus Kipruto (born 8 December 1994) is a Kenyan middle-distance runner who specializes in the 3000 metres steeplechase. He was the 2016 Rio Olympic champion in the event. At the World Athletics Championships, Kipruto won gold medals in 2017 and 2019, silver medals in 2013 and 2015, and a bronze in 2022. In 2018, he captured gold medals at the African Championships and Commonwealth Games. He is a four-time Diamond League winner.

Kipruto was the 2011 World Youth champion in the 2000 m steeplechase, and won the 2012 World Junior title over the longer distance. He ranks second on the all-time junior lists with a time of 8:01.16 minutes. He set his personal best of 8:00.12 at the Birmingham Diamond League event in 2016.

== Career ==
Kipruto quickly rose through the younger categories of the sport, beginning from 2010. He won the Kenyan youth trials in the 2000 m steeplechase with a world-leading mark of 5:29.3 minutes. At the 2011 World Youth Championships in Athletics he and teammate Gilbert Kiplangat Kirui ran away from the pack from the very start. Kipruto edged out his compatriot with a time of 5:28.65 minutes to take the gold medal and move up to seventh on the all-time youth rankings. He debuted in the 3000 m steeplechase in Europe later that year, running 8:27.30 minutes to win at the Stadionfest Königs Wusterhausen.

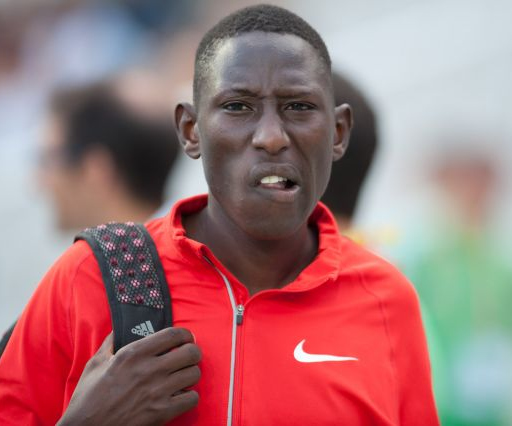
Kipruto preparing to race in 2012

At the start of 2012 he entered two high-profile cross country races, winning the Lotto Cross Cup de Hannut and placing second at the Cross de San Sebastián. He moved up to the 3000 m distance in the steeplechase and placed second at the Kawasaki Super Meet in Japan before running 8:08.92 minutes for fifth in his IAAF Diamond League debut in Doha. He beat Kirui to the Kenyan junior title and his teammate helped pace him at the 2012 World Junior Championships in Athletics, where Kipruto won Kenya's 13th straight title in the event and ranked fourth on the all-time junior lists with a run of 8:06.10 minutes (also a championship record). He had his first big senior win soon after, beating Paul Kipsiele Koech at the Herculis 2012 Diamond League meet in a personal best of 8:03.49 minutes. He ranked sixth in the world that year. He also was runner-up at the Memorial van Damme and had a 3000 metres flat best of 7:44.09 minutes at the Rieti Meeting.

Kipruto made his first Kenyan cross country team in 2013. After a win at the Cross Internacional Juan Muguerza and third position at the Cross Internacional de Itálica in Spain, he only just made the junior team at the Kenyan trials, placing sixth. He performed one place better at the 2013 IAAF World Cross Country Championships, helping Kenya to the junior team silver medal. Heading into the track season, he opened with a meet record of 8:01.16 minutes at the Shanghai Golden Grand Prix, winning the first leg of the 2013 IAAF Diamond League steeplechase. This ranked him second on the all-time junior lists behind Stephen Cherono.

== Achievements ==
=== International competitions ===
Representing Kenya
Year	Competition	Venue	Position	Event	Notes
2011	World Youth Championships	Lille, France	1st	2000 m st.	5:28.65
2012	World Junior Championships	Barcelona, Spain	1st	3000 m st.	8:06.10
2013	World Cross Country Championships	Bydgoszcz, Poland	5th	Junior race	21:40
2013	World Championships	Moscow, Russia	2nd	3000 m st.	8:06.37
2015	World Championships	Beijing, China	2nd	3000 m st.	8:12.38
2016	Olympic Games	Rio de Janeiro, Brazil	1st	3000 m st.	8:03.28 OR
2017	World Championships	London, United Kingdom	1st	3000 m st.	8:14.12
2018	Commonwealth Games	Gold Coast, Australia	1st	3000 m st.	8:10.08
2018	African Championships	Asaba, Nigeria	1st	3000 m st.	8:26.37
2019	African Games	Rabat, Morocco	–	3000 m st.	DNF
2019	World Championships	Doha, Qatar	1st	3000 m st.	8:01.35
2022	World Championships	Eugene, OR, United States	3rd	3000 m st.	8:27.92

=== Circuit wins and titles ===
- Diamond League overall winner 3000 m steeplechase: 2013, 2016
- Diamond League champion 3000 m steeplechase: 2017, 2018

3000 metres steeplechase wins, other events specified in parentheses

- 2012 (1): Monaco Herculis (PB)
- 2013 (3): Shanghai Golden Grand Prix (WL MR PB), Eugene Prefontaine Classic (MR), Oslo Bislett Games
- 2015 (1): London Anniversary Games
- 2016 (6): Doha Qatar Athletic Super Grand Prix (WL), Rabat Meeting International (WL MR), Rome Golden Gala (WL), Birmingham British Athletics Grand Prix (WL MR PB), Monaco, Brussels Memorial Van Damme
- 2017 (2): Rome, Brussels
- 2018 (3): Rome (WL), Birmingham, Zürich Weltklasse

=== Personal bests ===
- 3000 metres – 7:44.09 (Rieti 2012)
- 3000 metres indoor – 7:55.76 (Glasgow 2016)
- 5000 metres – 13:47.5h (Eldoret 2016)
- 10,000 metres – 29:24.7h (Eldoret 2016)
- 2000 metres steeplechase – 5:28.65 (Lille 2011)
- 3000 metres steeplechase – 8:00.12 (Birmingham 2016)
