= Kennedy Njiru =

Kenyan steeplechase runner (1987 - 2020)

Personal information
- Full name: Kennedy Muriithi Njiru
- Nationality: Kenya
- Born: 1987
- Died: 7 January 2020 (aged 32–33) Nyahururu, Kenya

Sport
- Sport: Athletics
- Event: 3000 metres steeplechase
- Club: Kenya Defence Forces

Achievements and titles
- National finals: 2010 Kenyan XC Champs; • 12 km XC, 82nd; 2012 Kenyan Champs; • 3000mSC, 6th; 2013 Kenyan Champs; • 3000mSC, 5th; 2014 Kenyan Champs; • 3000mSC, 9th; 2018 Kenyan Champs; • 3000mSC, 3rd (bronze); 2019 Kenyan Champs; • 3000mSC, 10th; 2019 Worlds Trials; • 3000mSC, 3rd (bronze); 2019 Kenyan XC Champs; • 12 km XC, 35th
- Personal bests: 3000mSC: 8:18.04 (2018); 10K: 28:00 (2019)

Kennedy Muriithi Njiru (1987 – 7 January 2020), also known as Kenneth Njiru or Kennedy Njiri, was a Kenyan steeplechase and long-distance runner. With a 3000 metres steeplechase personal best of 8:18.48, he finished third place twice at the Kenyan national championships and finished highly at several major international road races and Diamond League meetings. On 7 January 2020, he died in a car accident in Kenya.

== Biography ==
Njiru's first national track final was in 2012, when he finished 6th in the 3000 metres steeplechase at the Kenyan Athletics Championships with a time of 8:37.2. The following year, he set a personal best of 8:31.4 and improved his national placing to 5th, followed by a 9th place national finish in 2014.

In 2015, Njiru did not advance to the finals at the national championships in the steeplechase. However, in October that year he made his international debut on the roads, finishing 4th at the Trento Half Marathon and then six days later finishing 4th at the Giro al Sas road race in Italy.

Njiru ran four half marathons in 2017, improving his personal best to 1:02:19 at the Semi-Marathon International de Berkane in Morocco. On 15 October, Njiru started the Gyeongju International Marathon but did not finish. In December, Njiru improved his 3000 m steeplechase personal best by one tenth of a second, running 8:31.3 to win a meeting in Machakos, Kenya.

Njiru made a marked improvement in 2018, choosing to focus solely on the steeplechase this year. He set a personal best of 8:24.2 to win the Kenya Defence Forces championships on 6 June, and then later that month he achieved his first national medal by finishing 3rd at the Kenyan Athletics Championships in another personal best of 8:18.48. His placing earned him selection for his first Diamond League meetings, where he finished 7th at the 2018 Herculis meeting in Monaco, and 10th at the 2018 Weltklasse in Zürich. His time of 8:18.04 in Monaco would stand as his final personal best. Njiru was selected to represent Kenya at the 2018 African Championships in the 3000 m steeplechase, but he was one of two athletes to not start the race.

In his final year of competition in 2019, Njiru achieved another third-place national showing at the 2019 Kenyan World Championships Trials, as well as a 10th place showing at the separate Kenyan Athletics Championships meeting that year. From 7 to 14 May 2019, Njiru was ranked 12th in the world at steeplechase events by World Athletics. His 10 kilometres road time of 28:00 to finish 2nd at the Cooper River Bridge Run earned him 1,132 World Athletics Rankings points, his best score aside from his steeplechase times.

== Death ==
On Tuesday, 7 January 2020, Njiru was driving along a road connecting Nyeri to Nyahururu, towards Nyahururu. On the drive, his sedan car collided head-on with a Toyota Land Cruiser headed in the opposite direction. According to Nyandarua County police, Njiru lost control of his own car towards the famous equator line on the road, which caused it to collide with the Land Cruiser. Three tourists of Russian origin in the Cruiser were injured from the accident and taken to the hospital in critical condition, while Njiru was proclaimed dead on the spot.

His death was mourned by Athletics Kenya officials as well as steeplechase world champion Milcah Chemos, 2015 javelin world champion Julius Yego, and former marathon world record holder Patrick Makau.

== Personal bests ==
Event	Mark	Competition	Venue	Date
3000 metres steeplechase	8:18.04	Monaco Diamond League	Monaco	20 July 2018
10 kilometres (road)	28:00	Cooper River Bridge Run	Charleston, South Carolina	6 April 2019
